= Cypriot Americans =

Americans of Cypriot birth or descent

Total population
- 10,437 (2019)

Regions with significant populations
- New York; New Jersey; California; Florida; Massachusetts; Connecticut; Illinois; Rhode Island

Languages
- English; Cypriot Greek; Cypriot Turkish; Cypriot Arabic; Armenian

Religion
- Eastern Christianity; Sunni Islam

Related ethnic groups
- Greek Cypriots; Turkish Cypriots; Greek Americans; Turkish Americans

Cypriot Americans (Greek: Κυπριοαμερικανοί, romanized: Kyprioamerikanoí) are Americans of full or partial Cypriot ancestry. Cypriot Americans, alongside English, speak Cypriot Greek, Cypriot Turkish, Cypriot Arabic, or Armenian. The majority of Cypriot Americans are either Eastern Christians (predominantly members of the Eastern Orthodox Church of Cyprus and Maronites) or Sunni Muslims.

Despite their historically rural origins, early Cypriot immigrants mainly settled in large urban centers, with New York City harboring the largest community. The state of New York is home to the highest number of Cypriot Americans (approximately 2,587), followed by New Jersey and Florida.

== History ==
=== First arrivals ===
Cyprus reports that emigration to the United States began as early as the 1830s, but data is available only after 1954. The earliest Greek immigrants arrived in 1768 and settled at New Smyrna near Saint Augustine, Florida, in a colony of 450. Turkish American immigration is not well documented. It is assumed that the Turkish Cypriots who came to the United States between 1820 and 1860 were fleeing religious or political persecution.

Although the political and religious persecution of Turkish Cypriots during 1830 and 1860 in Cyprus is highly unlikely because Cyprus was part of the Ottoman empire at the time.

=== Significant immigration ===
The periods of greatest emigration were between 1955 and 1959, the 1960s and between 1974 and 1979. These were times of political instability and socio-economic insecurity. Between 1955 and 1959, the period of anti-colonial struggle, 29,000 Cypriots (5 percent of the population) left the island. In the 1960s, during periods of economic recession and inter-communal strife, 50,000 Cypriots (8.5 percent of the island's population) left Cyprus. Most of these immigrants were young males, usually unemployed and from rural areas; only 5 percent were university graduates. Although 75 percent immigrated to Britain and another 10 percent went to Australia, about 5 percent went to North America. After the 1974 Turkish Invasion of Cyprus 51,500 Turkish and Greek Cypriots left as immigrants and another 15,000 became temporary workers abroad. The new wave of immigrants had Australia as the most common destination (35 percent), followed by North America, Greece and UK. According to U.S. statistics, Cypriot immigration peaked at 828 in 1976, with the number of immigrants dropping to 291 in 1984.

== Settlement ==
Greek Cypriots have tended to settle in areas where there were already established Greek communities. In 1984, 274 Cypriots became Americans. Of this group, 109 settled in New York City, 47 settled in New Jersey, 21 in California, 13 each in Maryland and Virginia and 10 each in Florida and Illinois. Many Cypriot Americans live in San Diego and Los Angeles. Another community settled in New Jersey, in Flemington, Brickton and Wayside. According to the 1990 U.S. Census 4,897 people of Cypriot ancestry live in the United States. According to the 2000 census, that number increased to 7,663. Of these, some 3,337 said they were simply "Cypriot Americans," 3,965 claimed that Cypriot Greek origin and 361 claimed that were of Cypriot Turkish descent.

== Culture ==
=== Role of women ===
Modern Cypriot American women are better educated than their mothers and are more likely to work outside the home. While the traditional domestic role is still an expectation, Cypriot American women are more likely to balance the home responsibilities with a professional occupation.

After World War II, Cypriot women had greater access to education and increased their participation in the work force. At the beginning of the century, the proportion of girls to boys enrolled in primary education was one to three. By 1943, about 80 percent of girls attended primary school. When elementary education was made mandatory in 1960, there were equal enrollment levels for boys and girls. By the 1980s, girls made up 45 percent of those receiving secondary education. Only after the mid-1960s did women commonly leave Cyprus to receive higher education. In the 1980s, women made up about 32 percent of those studying abroad.

Cypriot women have long participated in the work force, traditionally in agriculture. From 1960 to 1985, the women's share of the urban work force rose from 22 percent to 41 percent, while their share of the rural work force fell from 51 percent to 44.4 percent. Cypriot women had the same rights to social welfare as men in such matters as social security payments, unemployment compensation, vacation time and other common social provisions. Special protective legislation in 1985 provided women with marriage grants and with maternity grants that paid them 75 percent of their insurable earnings. But occupational gender segregation persisted in Cyprus at the beginning of the 1990s. The participation of women in clerical jobs had more than doubled since the late 1970s, yet only one woman in 15 was in an administrative or managerial position in 1985. Women's share of professional jobs increased to 39 percent by the mid-1980s, compared with 36 percent ten years earlier, but these jobs were concentrated in medicine and teaching, where women had traditionally found employment. In fields where men were dominant, Cypriot women's share of professional positions was 11 percent, up from 8 percent in 1976. In the fields where women were dominant, men took just under half the professional positions.

Traditional attitudes continue to change, especially in urban areas, but were still prevalent in the early 1990s. Although most Cypriot women worked outside the home, they were expected to fulfill the traditional domestic roles with little help from Cypriot male spouses. Women with full-time jobs were pressured by the traditional standards of keeping a clean house and providing daily hot meals. In the 1990s, Cypriot women were still burdened with the expectation of safeguarding the honor of the family by avoiding any social contact with men that could be construed to have a sexual content. Greek Cypriot Americans uphold church traditions, such as abstaining from meat, fish or dairy products during Lent. Easter is the most celebrated religious holiday for Greek Cypriot Americans. Avgolemono soup, made from eggs and lemons in chicken stock, is traditional Easter fare, as are the flaounes, savory Easter cakes that contain a special Easter cheese, eggs, spices and herbs all wrapped in a yeast pastry.

In 1970, American sociologists Marvin Gerst and James H. Tenzel studied the two major ethnic communities of Cyprus and found that Turkish Cypriots value a society in which roles are clearly defined. For example, they regard public service as a more prestigious (though poor-paying) occupation than a successful business career. Turkish Cypriot Americans, though not strict Muslims, often become a part of the Muslim community in America.

=== Greek Orthodox baptism ===
Among Greek Orthodox believers, the wedding sponsors, the koumbari, act as godparents to the first child. The baptism ceremony of the Greek Orthodox church involves several steps. It begins at the narthex of the church, where the godparents speak for the child, renounce Satan, After reciting the Nicene Creed, the child's name is spoken for the first time. At the front of the church, the priest uses consecrated water to make the sign of the cross on various parts of the child, who is undressed. The godparents rub the child with olive oil and the priest immerses the child in water three times before handing the child to the godparents, who wrap him in a new white sheet. Following baptism, the child is anointed with a special oil (miron) and dressed in new clothing. A candle is lit and the priest and godparents hold the child while other children walk around in a dance signifying joy. Then scriptures are read and communion is given to the child.

=== Greek Cypriot courtship ===
In Greek Cypriot culture, an engagement is preceded by negotiations between parents, but parents could not force their children to accept arranged marriages. Cypriot Americans often choose their mates without parental involvement. Most Greek Cypriots have Greek Orthodox weddings.

For Turkish Cypriots, marriages were traditionally negotiated between parents, although today it is not uncommon for couples to meet at university and request their parents' approval. Marriage between Turkish Cypriot men and non Turkish Cypriot/Moslem women are much more common than between Turkish Cypriot women and non Turkish Cypriot/Moslem men due to religious and sociocultural factors. Being a secular people, most Turkish Cypriot marriages whether in Cyprus or the US, are civil weddings carried out by marriage celebrants and it is unusual for Turkish Cypriots to be married by imams. Divorce is not uncommon.

=== Weddings ===
In Cyprus, the most popular time for weddings is in the summer and the whole village celebrates. Resi, a rich pilaf of lamb and wheat, is prepared and special little shortbreads, kourabiedes, are piled high for the guests. The sponsor at a Cypriot wedding, similar to an American best man or maid of honor, becomes a ceremonial relative. The male sponsor, koumbaros, or female sponsor, koumbara, is expected to pay for the wedding expenses, except the rings. The sponsors usually become the godparents of the couple's first child. Most weddings involve several sponsors.

Traditionally, the bridegroom provided the house and the bride's family the furniture and linens. This was the dowry, the allocation of an equal portion of the parents' property to the children, male or female, at the time of marriage, rather than after the parents' death. Until the 1950s, this transfer of property at marriage was agreed to orally by the parties; more recently the so-called written dowry contract was introduced. It specifies the amount of property to be given to the couple. It is signed by all parties and enforced by religious authorities. After World War II, it became the bride's obligation to provide the house. Ownership of a house, given the scarcity of land (especially after the Turkish invasion of Cyprus) and the considerable expense of building, became a great advantage for a single woman seeking to marry. In the 1990s, working women's income primarily went to the construction of a house.

In rural Turkish Cypriot society, wedding festivities lasted for several days. Modern Turkish Cypriot couples often do not rely on their parents to arrange a match. Although dating, as practiced in the United States, was not common even at the beginning of the 1990s, couples met in small groups of friends. Once a couple decided to marry, both sets of parents were consulted. The families then arranged the engagement and marriage.

Turkish Cypriots adapted the Greek Cypriot tradition of the bride's family providing substantial assistance to the newlyweds by including assistance from both families. Traditionally, the bride's family provided a house, some furniture and money as part of their daughter's dowry. The bridegroom's family met the young couple's remaining housing needs. If the bride's family was unable to provide such assistance, the young couple lived with the bride's family until they saved enough money to set up a separate household. The bride brought to her new home the rest of her dowry, known as cehiz, which made the new family financially more secure. Turkish Cypriot Americans often provide their own housing, though families send assistance where possible.

=== Religion ===
Most Greek Cypriots are Greek Orthodox Christians, followers of the Church of Cyprus, a tradition using the Greek liturgy and headed by a synod composed of bishops and an elected archbishop. Turkish Cypriots are Muslims and form the second largest religious group. Ritual is the center of activity for the Orthodox church. Seven sacraments are recognized: baptism in infancy, followed by confirmation with consecrated oil, penance, the Eucharist, matrimony, ordination and unction in times of sickness or when near death. Many Greek Cypriot Americans are members of local Orthodox churches founded by Greek immigrants in even the smallest of communities, such as the church established in 1900 in Indianapolis by 29 immigrants.

Nearly all Turkish Cypriots were followers of Sunni Islam and are among the most secular of Islamic peoples, not abstaining from alcohol as standard Muslim teaching requires, but following traditional Mediterranean customs. Wedding ceremonies were civil, rather than religious. Religious leaders had little influence in politics and religious instruction, while available in schools, was not obligatory. Religion came to be a personal matter among Turkish Cypriots and they did not attempt to impose their religious beliefs on others. Although there was some fasting during Ramadan, moderate attendance at Friday prayers and widespread observation of the holy days, few Turkish Cypriots were orthodox Muslims. Some Turkish Cypriot Americans become more devoted, but most continue a less rigid adherence to Muslim beliefs.

== Maronites, Armenians and Latins ==
Cypriot Muslims and Christians can be said to be in a love/hate relationship. From the rise of Greek nationalism in the 1820s and 1830s through the later partitioning of Cyprus, the two major ethnic groups rarely cooperated,(with the exception of revolting against Ottoman taxation). Otherwise, there was no real segregation until Turkish troops landed on the island in 1974 in response to a Greek-sponsored coup aimed at annexing the island to Greece. Cyprus had three other ethnic groups at the beginning of the period: Maronites, Armenians and Latins. Together they numbered only about 6,000—less than one percent of the island's population, but they maintained social institutions of their own and were represented in organs of government. The Maronites and Armenians came during the Byzantine period and the Latins slightly later. Maronites are Catholic Christians of Aramaean origin, who settled in Cyprus 1,200 years ago from Lebanon. They speak an Arabic dialect mixed with many Greek and Turkish words. By the mid-twentieth century, they lived mainly in four villages in northwestern Cyprus. Armenian Cypriots were primarily urban and mercantile, most of whom had arrived after World War I. Latins were concentrated among merchant families of the port towns on the southern coast and were descendants of the Lusignan and Venetian upper classes.

== Employment and economy ==
Fifty-nine percent of Cypriot immigrants in 1984 had professional occupations. Cypriot Americans are highly educated. Many Greek Cypriot Americans are teachers, physicians and academics. Turkish Cypriot Americans are often employed as physicians, scientists and engineers. While immigrants in the first half of the twentieth century were often unskilled laborers who found employment in large industrial cities, subsequent immigrants were highly skilled professionals employed in virtually every field.

Education was a common way of rising in social status and most Cypriots respected higher education and white collar professions. The expanding economy in the second half of the twentieth century allowed many Cypriots to obtain more sophisticated work than their parents. Within one generation, a family could move from an agricultural background to urban professions in teaching, government or small business. The traditional economy of subsistence agriculture and animal husbandry was replaced by a commercial economy, centered in expanding urban areas. The flight from agriculture reached a peak in 1974, when the best and most productive agricultural land fell into Turkish hands. In 1960, some 40.3 percent of the economically active population were agricultural workers; in 1973, the figure was down to 33.6 percent. In 1988, government figures estimated only 13.9 percent of the work force earned a living from farming full-time.

== Politics ==
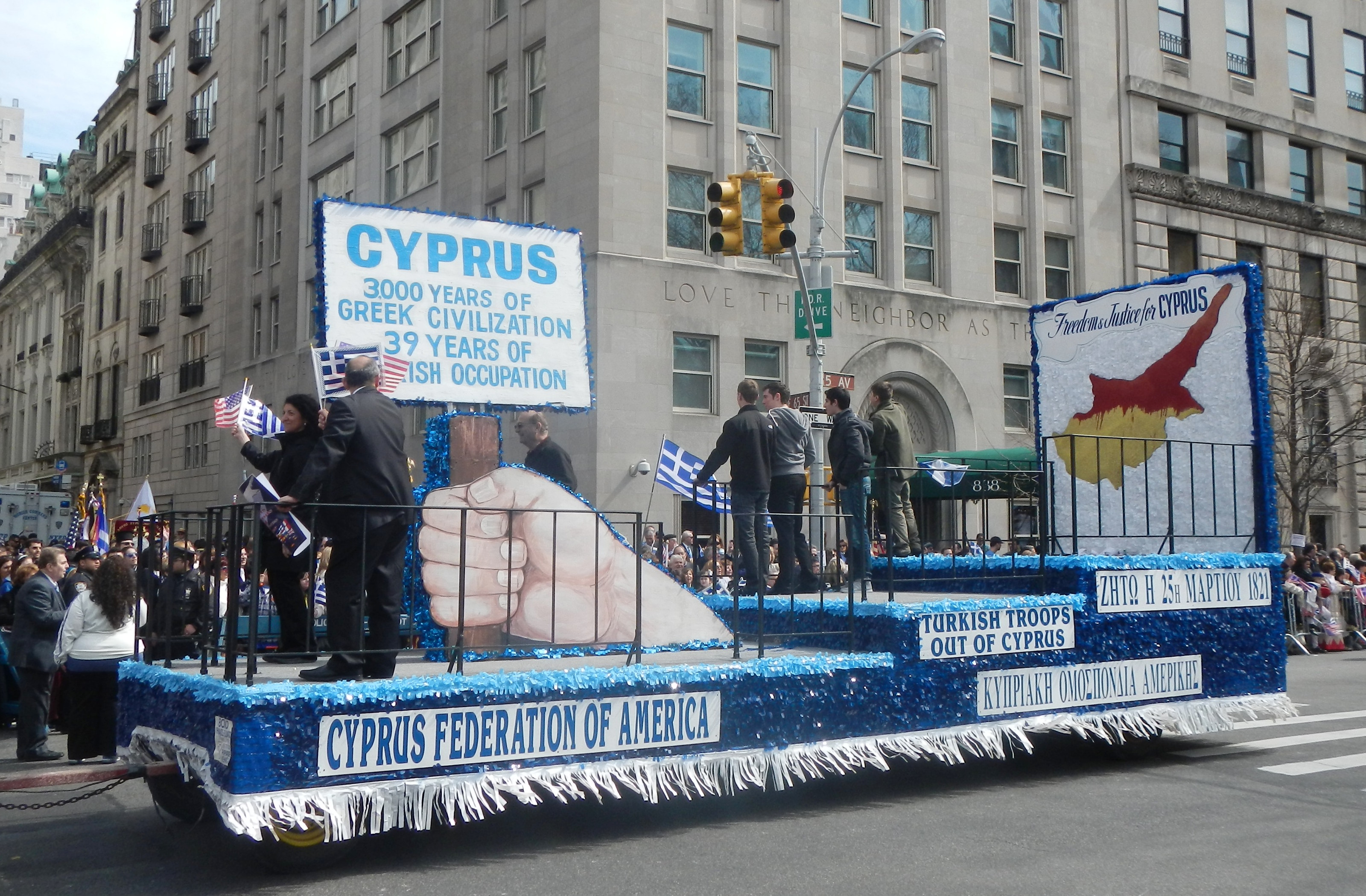
Cyprus Federation of America

Numerous Greek American political and social organizations have existed since the 1880s. Turkish American involvement in American politics did not begin until the Turkish Invasion of Cyprus in 1974 mobilized individuals seeking to counter U.S. government support for the Greeks. In the 1990s, Cypriot American organizations for both Greek and Turk ethnic groups lobbied for political advantage.

Greek Cypriot immigrants are loyal to both the United States and Cyprus, as well as having a strong cultural and ethnic loyalty to Greece. During both world wars, Greek Cypriot Americans served in the United States armed forces and participated in assorted war fund drives. Cypriots were staunch supporters of the Allied cause in World War II. This was particularly true after the 1940 German invasion of Greece. The draft was not imposed on the island, but 6,000 Greek-Cypriot volunteers fought under British command during the Greek campaign, due to British promises that Cyprus would be ceded to Greece after the war. Before the war ended, more than 30,000 had served in the British forces.

== Relations with the Republic of Cyprus ==
Cypriot Americans remain involved in political issues of importance to Cyprus. In late 1999, U.S. President Bill Clinton expressed his commitment to finding a solution to the Cyprus problem and stated that his administration would intensify efforts to bring all interested parties together for talks.

Relations between Cyprus and the United States were hindered by the 1974 assassination of United States Ambassador Roger Davies in Nicosia. The Nixon and Ford administrations became involved in refugee resettlement and peace talks during the 1974 crisis and a more activist American policy was instituted. A special Cyprus Coordinator in the Department of State was established in 1981. The position was successively held by Reginald Bartholemew (1981–82), Christian Chapman (1982–83), Richard Haass (1983–85), James Wilkenson (1985–89) and Nelson Ledsky (1989–95), James Williams (1995–96), Carey Cavanaugh (1996–97), Thomas Miller (1997–99), Thomas Weston (1999-2004), Laura Kennedy (2004–2007). In June 1995, the United States appointed Richard Beattie as Special Presidential Emissary for Cyprus. He was followed by Ambassador Richard C. Holbrooke (1997-1999) and Alfred Moses (1999-2000). Efforts to stimulate discussion about confidence-building measures, inter-communal projects and cooperation and new directions in the United States' $15 million annual aid program to Cyprus met resistance from the Republic's government. The Republic looked to the United States Congress and the Greek American community to correct what they considered a pro-Turkish bias in U.S. policy.

The total value of U.S. exports to Cyprus was about $700 million in 1997, making the United States Cyprus's leading import supplier. Since the mid-1970s the United States has channeled $305 million in assistance to the two communities through the United Nations High Commissioner for Refugees and the Cyprus Red Cross. The United States provides $15 million annually to promote bi-communal projects and finance U.S. scholarships for Greek and Turkish Cypriots.

Successive U.S. administrations have viewed United Nations-led inter-communal negotiations as the best means to achieve a fair and permanent settlement in Cyprus. As of 1999, the United States actively supports and aids the United Nations Secretary General's efforts to settle the divisions in Cyprus.

== Notable people ==
- Abdul Kerim al-Qubrusi, Sufi sheikh
- Emilea Zingas, figure skating world bronze medalist
- Kyriacos A. Athanasiou, current Distinguished Professor of Biomedical Engineering at the University of California Davis
- Charlie Crist, 44th Governor of Florida and former U.S. representative
- Phoebus Dhrymes, former professor of economics at Columbia University
- Bilge Ebiri, film director
- Erden Eruç, first person in history to complete an entirely solo and human-powered circumnavigation of the Earth
- Halil Güven, Dean of San Diego State University - Georgia
- K. C. Nicolaou, chemist and academic
- C. L. Max Nikias, engineer, academic, and 11th (and current) President of the University of Southern California
- Yılmaz Orhan, former football (soccer) player
- Hal Ozsan, actor
- Aristos Petrou, member of the rap duo Suicideboys whose father is a Greek Cypriot immigrant
- Sir Christopher Pissarides 2010 joint Nobel Prize winner for Economics. Regius Professor of Economics at the London School of Economics, and Professor of European Studies at the University of Cyprus. Knighted for "services to economics."
- Costas Philippou, MMA fighter in the UFC
- Jane Remover, rapper, producer, singer-songwriter
- Harris Savides, cinematographer
- Symeon C. Symeonides, dean of Willamette University College of Law
- Marius Vassiliou, computational scientist and research executive
- Vamık Volkan, professor emeritus of psychiatry at the University of Virginia School of Medicine
- Garo Yepremian, football place-kicker, of Armenian descent, born in Larnaca, played for the Miami Dolphins

== Museums and research ==
- Institute of Cypriot Studies, University at Albany, State University of New York
- Cyprus Museum (Jacksonville)

== See also ==
- Cyprus–United States relations
- Cypriot diaspora
- Greek Americans
- Turkish Americans
- British Cypriots
