= Pi Tau Sigma =

International mechanical engineering honor society

- ΠΤΣ
- Founded: March 16, 1915; 111 years ago University of Illinois Urbana-Champaign
- Type: Honor
- Affiliation: ACHS
- Status: Active
- Emphasis: Mechanical engineering
- Scope: International
- Pillars: Integrity, Service, and Leadership
- Member badge
- Colors: Murrey and Azure
- Symbol: Carnot cycle
- Flower: White Rose
- Publication: The Condenser
- Chapters: 182
- Members: 118,000+ lifetime
- Headquarters: c/o Dr. Arden Moore Institute for Micromanufacturing 911 Hergot Avenue 10137; Ruston, Louisiana 71272; United States
- Website: www.pitausigma.org

Pi Tau Sigma (ΠΤΣ) is an international honor society in the field of mechanical engineering. The society was established in 1915 at the University of Illinois. It has 182 chapters.

== History ==
Pi Tau Sigma was established on March 16, 1915, at the University of Illinois. A similar organization was formed on November 15, 1915, at the University of Wisconsin. The two groups met in Chicago to join their societies on March 12, 1916. Pi Tau Sigma was formed as a national honor society for men in the field of mechanical engineering. Oliver C. K. Hutchinson and John B. Wilkinson were its founding co-chairs.

The society expanded to include six chapters in its first ten years. It became a member of the Association of College Honor Societies in 1947. By 1962, it had chartered 74 chapters and had 30,000 members. By 2010, it had initiated 118,404 members. In 2025, its national address is in Ruston Louisiana.

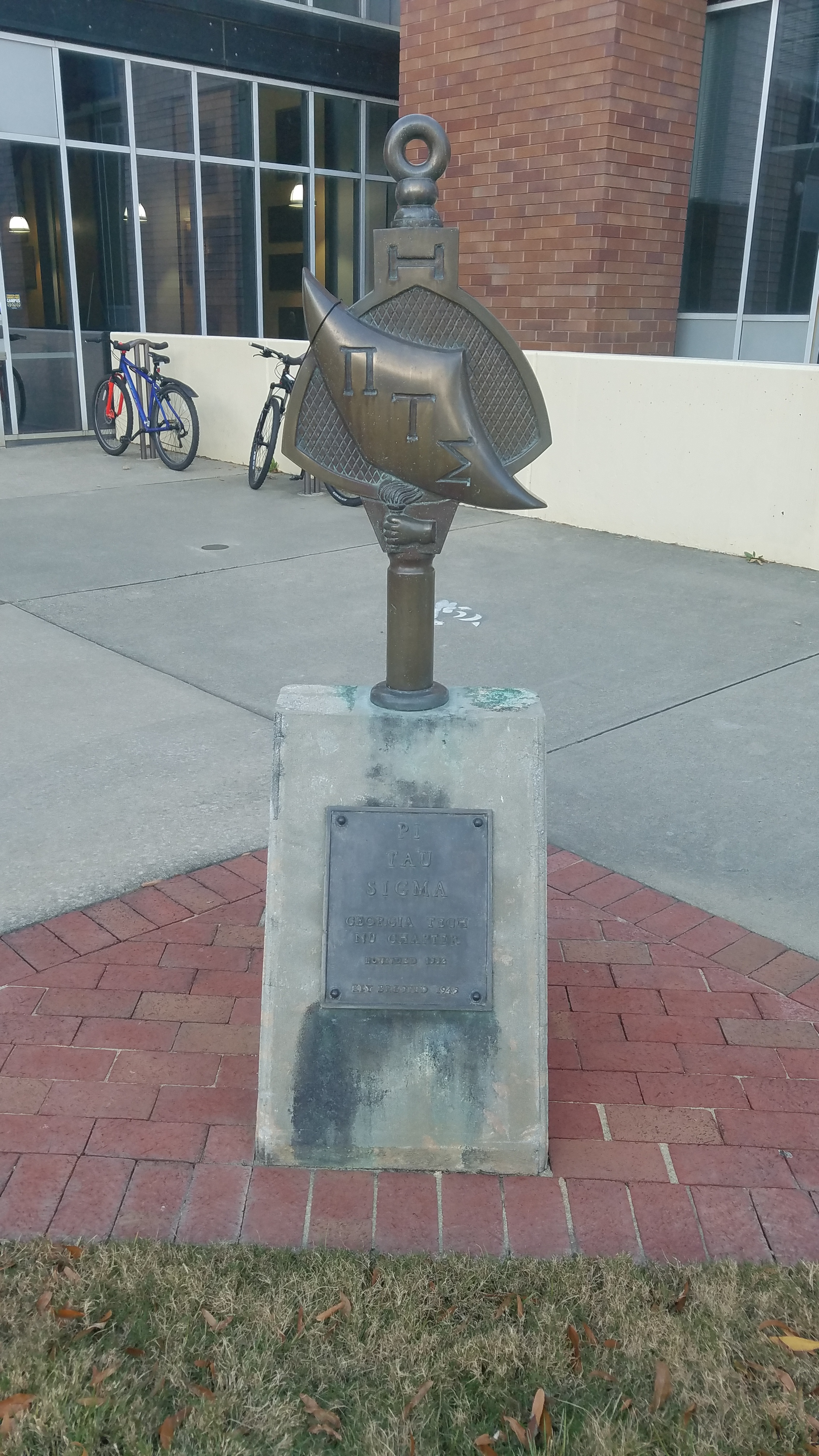
Pi Tau Sigma marker at Georgia Tech

== Symbols ==
Pi Tau Sigma's key features the Carnot cycle. Its colors are Murrey and Azure. Its flower is the white rose. Its core values or pillars are Integrity, Service, and Leadership. Its annual publication is The Condenser.

== Activities ==
Pi Tau Sigma presents the Outstanding Young Mechanical Engineer Award and Outstanding Mechanical Engineer Awards at the American Society of Mechanical Engineers annual winter meeting.

== Membership ==
Upperclassmen and graduate students studying mechanical engineering are eligible to join Pi Tau Sigma, based on academic performance. Juniors must be in the top 25 percent of their class and seniors in the top 35 percent of their class. Membership is lifetime.

There are three grades of membership: Honorary, Graduate, and Active.

== Chapters ==
As of 2024, Pi Tau Sigma has 182 chapters in the United States, Mexico, Qatar, and the United Arab Emirates.

== Notable members ==
- Elayne Arrington, mathematician and engineer
- James P. Bagian, physician, astronaut and engineer
- Yvonne Clark, a pioneer for African-American and women engineers, professor at the College of Engineering and Technology at Tennessee State University
- Oluwami Dosunmu-Ogunbi, roboticist, engineer, and educator
- Hans Albert Einstein, professor of hydraulic engineering at the University of California, Berkeley
- Halil Güven, dean of San Diego State University - Georgia
- Yonggang Huang, professor of mechanical engineering at Northwestern University.
- Bohdan Kulakowski, professor of mechanical engineering at Pennsylvania State University
- Roger Linquist, chairman, chief executive officer and co-founder of Metro PCS
- J. Wayne Littles, eighth director of the NASA Marshall Space Flight Center
- Calvin Mackie, motivational speaker and entrepreneur
- Charles Meneveau, professor of mechanical engineering and an associate director of the Institute for Data Intensive Engineering and Science at Johns Hopkins University
- Mark Monmonier, professor of geography and the environment at Syracuse University.
- Jack Roeser, chairman and founder of Otto Engineering in Carpentersville, Illinois
- Jack Swigert, United States House of Representatives, NASA astronaut, test pilot, mechanical engineer, and aerospace engineer
- John J. Uicker, professor of mechanical engineering at the University of Wisconsin-Madison,
- Richard Leroy Walters, a jet propulsion engineer and philanthropist
- Arthur Cutts Willard, President of the University of Illinois system

== See also ==
- Honor cords
- List of engineering societies
- Professional fraternities and sororities
