= Turkish Cypriot diaspora =

Ethnic diaspora

The Turkish Cypriot diaspora is a term used to refer to the Turkish Cypriot community living outside the island of Cyprus.

== Population ==
Country	Council of Europe (1993 estimate)	TRNC Ministry of Foreign Affairs (2001 estimate)	TÜBİTAK (2016 estimate)	Other estimates	Further information
Turkey	300,000 (immigrants only)	500,000	500,000	300,000 (1968 estimate); Including descendants, exceeding 600,000 (2018 estimate)	see Turkish Cypriot muhacirs
United Kingdom	100,000 (immigrants only in England)	200,000	300,000	300,000-400,000 (including descendants)	British Cypriots; British Turks
Australia	30,000 (immigrants only)	40,000	120,000	120,000 (including descendants)	Turkish Australian
North America; United States; Canada	N/A; 7,000 (immigrants only); 6,000 (immigrants only)	10,000; N/A; N/A	N/A; 5,000; 1,800	N/A; 5,000; 1,800	Cypriot American; Turkish American; Turkish Canadians
Palestine	N/A	N/A	N/A	4,000 (early twentieth century Turkish Cypriot brides only)	
Germany	N/A	N/A	2,000	2,000	Turks in Germany
New Zealand	N/A	N/A	1,600	1,600	Turks in New Zealand
South Africa	N/A	N/A	"small community"	N/A	Turks in South Africa
Other	N/A	5,000	N/A	N/A	

== Australia ==
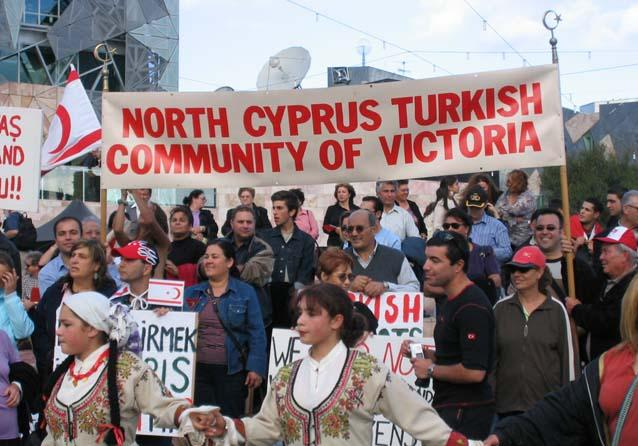
Turkish Cypriot community in Victoria, Australia.

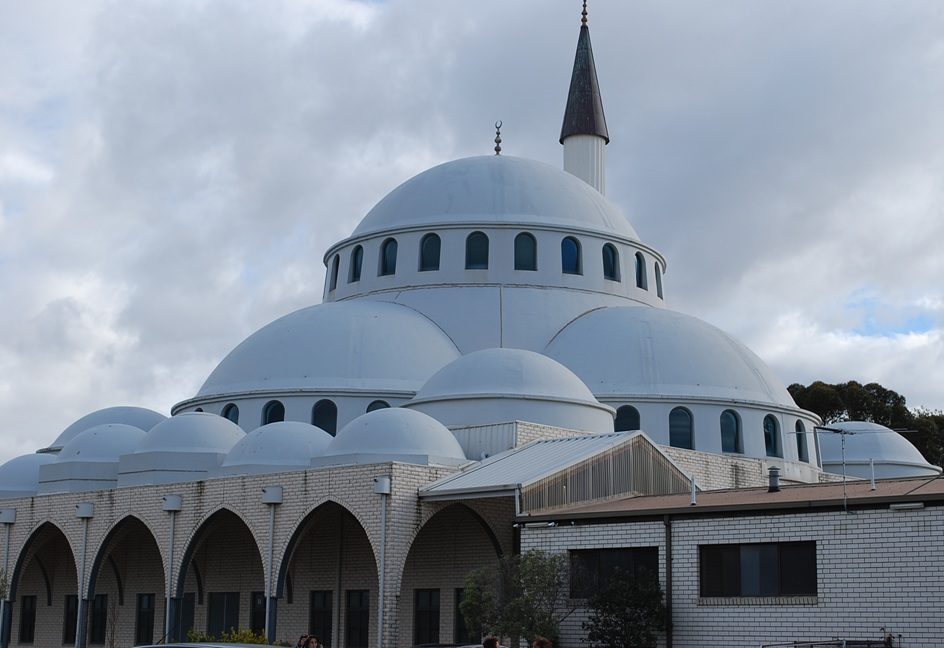
The Sunshine Mosque, in Melbourne, was built by the Cyprus Turkish Islamic Society in 1992.

Turkish Cypriot migration to Australia began in the late 1940s; they were the only Muslims acceptable under the White Australia Policy. Prior to 1940, the Australian census recorded only three settlers from Cyprus that spoke Turkish as their primary language, although many Turkish Cypriot arrivals spoke Greek as their first language. A further 66 Turkish Cypriots arrived in Australia in the late 1940s, marking the beginning of a Turkish Cypriot immigration trend to Australia. By 1947-1956 there were 350 Turkish Cypriot settlers who were living in Australia. Between 1955-1960, the Turkish Cypriots felt vulnerable in Cyprus as they had cause for concern about the political future of the island when the Greek Cypriots attempted to overthrow the British government and unite Cyprus with Greece (known as "enosis"). After a failed attempt by the Greek Cypriots, the right-wing party, EOKA, reformed itself from 1963–1974 and launched a series of attacks. This resulted in the exodus of more Turkish Cypriots to Australia in fear for their lives. Early Turkish Cypriot immigrants to Australia found jobs working in factories, out in the fields, or building national infrastructure. Some Turkish Cypriots also became entrepreneurs and established their own businesses once they had saved enough money. By 1974, an exodus of more Turkish Cypriots to Australia occurred due to fears that the island would unite with Greece when the Greek military junta staged a coup d'état against the Cypriot President, with the help of EOKA B. Immigration to Australia has continued since as a result of an economic embargo which was launched against the Turkish Cypriots by the Greek Cypriot controlled Republic of Cyprus due to the establishment of the Turkish Republic of Northern Cyprus (TRNC) which has remained internationally unrecognised except by Turkey.

== Turkey ==
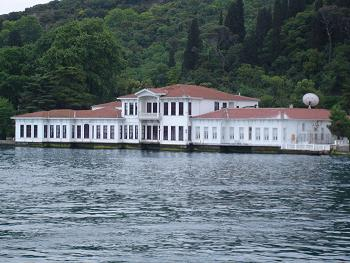
Owned by the Turkish Cypriot grand vizier, the Kıbrıslı Mehmed Emin Pasha mansion, in Istanbul, Turkey, is still owned by his descendants today.

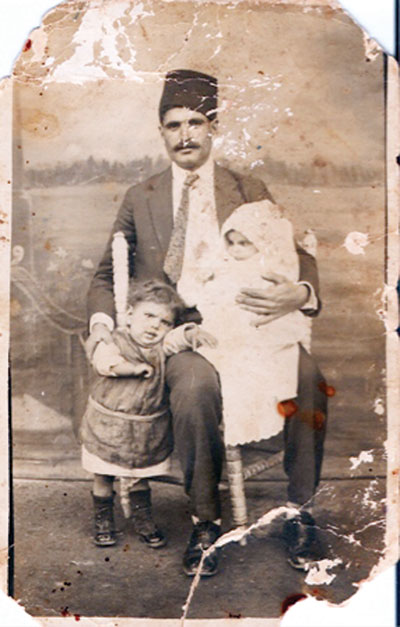
A Turkish Cypriot family who migrated to Turkey in 1935.

The first wave of Turkish Cypriot immigration to Turkey occurred in 1878 when the Ottoman Empire leased Cyprus to Great Britain; at that time, 15,000 Turkish Cypriots moved to Anatolia. The flow of Turkish Cypriot emigration to Turkey continued in the aftermath of the First World War, and gained its greatest velocity in the mid-1920s, and continued, at fluctuating speeds during the Second World War.

Economic motives played an important part as conditions for the poor in Cyprus during the 1920s were especially harsh. Enthusiasm to emigrate to Turkey was inflated by the euphoria that greeted the birth of the newly established Republic of Turkey and later of promises of assistance to Turks who emigrated. A decision made by the Turkish Government at the end of 1925, for instance, noted that the Turks of Cyprus had, according to the Treaty of Lausanne, the right to emigrate to the republic, and therefore, families that so emigrated would be given a house and sufficient land. The precise number of those who emigrated to Turkey is a matter that remains unknown.

The press in Turkey reported in mid-1927 that of those who had opted for Turkish nationality, 5,000–6,000 Turkish Cypriots had already settled in Turkey. However, many Turkish Cypriots had already emigrated even before the rights accorded to them under the Treaty of Lausanne had come into force.

St. John-Jones estimated the demographic impact of Turkish Cypriot emigration to Turkey during the 1920s arguing that:

"[I]f the Turkish-Cypriot community had, like the Greek-Cypriots, increased by 101 per cent between 1881 and 1931, it would have totalled 91,300 in 1931 – 27,000 more than the number enumerated. Is it possible that so many Turkish-Cypriots emigrated in the fifty-year period? Taken together, the considerations just mentioned suggest that it probably was. From a base of 45,000 in 1881, emigration of anything like 27,000 persons seems huge, but after subtracting the known 5,000 of the 1920s, the balance represents an average annual outflow of some 500 – not enough, probably, to concern the community's leaders, evoke official comment, or be documented in any way which survives today".

Metin Heper and Bilge Criss have made a similar observation:

The first wave of immigration from Cyprus occurred in 1878 when the Ottomans were obliged to lease the island to Great Britain; at that time, 15,000 people moved to Anatolia. When the 1923 Lausanne Treaty gave the island to Great Britain another 30,000 immigrants came to Turkey.

By August 31, 1955, a statement by Turkey's Minister of State and Acting Foreign Minister, Fatin Rüştü Zorlu, at the London Conference on Cyprus, stated that:

Consequently, today [1955] as well, when we take into account the state of the population in Cyprus, it is not sufficient to say, for instance, that 100,000 Turks live there. One should rather say that 100,000 out of 24,000,000 Turks live there and that 300,000 Turkish Cypriots live in various parts of Turkey.

== United Kingdom ==
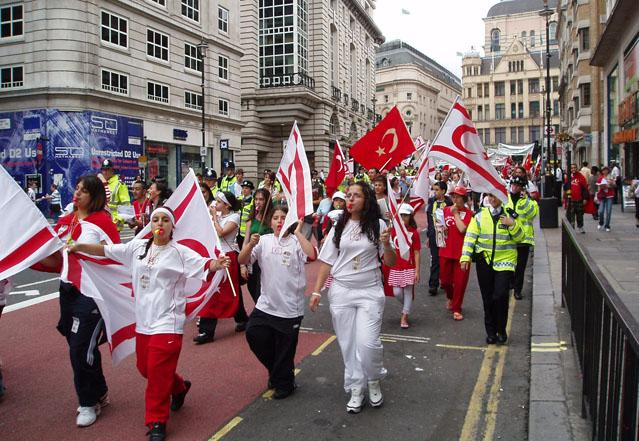
There is a strong Turkish Cypriot community living in London, United Kingdom.

Turkish Cypriot migration to the United Kingdom began in the early 1920s when the British Empire annexed Cyprus in 1914 and the residents of Cyprus became subjects of the Crown. Some arrived as students and tourists whilst others left the island due to the harsh economic and political life during the British Colony of Cyprus. Emigration to the United Kingdom continued to increase when the Great Depression of 1929 brought economic depression to Cyprus, with unemployment and low wages being a significant issue. During the Second World War, the number of Turkish run cafes increased from 20 in 1939 to 200 in 1945 which created a demand for more Turkish Cypriot workers. Throughout the 1950s, Turkish Cypriots emigrated for economic reasons and by 1958 their number was estimated to be 8,500. Their numbers continued to increase each year as rumours about immigration restrictions appeared in much of the Cypriot media.

The 1950s also saw the arrival of many Turkish Cypriots to the United Kingdom due to political reasons; many began to flee as a result of the EOKA terrorists and its aim of "enosis". Once inter-ethnic fighting broke out in 1963, and some 25,000 Turkish Cypriots became internally displaced, accounting to about a fifth of their population. The political and economic unrest in Cyprus, after 1964, sharply increased the number of Turkish Cypriot immigrants to the United Kingdom. Many of these early migrants worked in the clothing industry in London, where both men and women could work together; many worked in the textile industry as sewing was a skill which the community had already acquired in Cyprus. Turkish Cypriots were concentrated mainly in the north-east of London and specialised in the heavy-wear sector, such as coats and tailored garments. This sector offered work opportunities where poor knowledge of the English language was not a problem and where self-employment was a possibility.

Once the Turkish Cypriots declared their own state, the Turkish Republic of Northern Cyprus, the division of the island led to an economic embargo against the Turkish Cypriots. This had the effect of depriving the Turkish Cypriots of foreign investment, aid and export markets; thus, it caused the Turkish Cypriot economy to remain stagnant and undeveloped. Due to these economic and political issues, an estimated 130,000 Turkish Cypriots have emigrated from Northern Cyprus since its establishment to the United Kingdom.

A 2011 report published by the Home Affairs Committee suggested that out of a total of about 500,000 people of Turkish origin in the UK, 300,000 are of Turkish Cypriot origin.

== United States ==
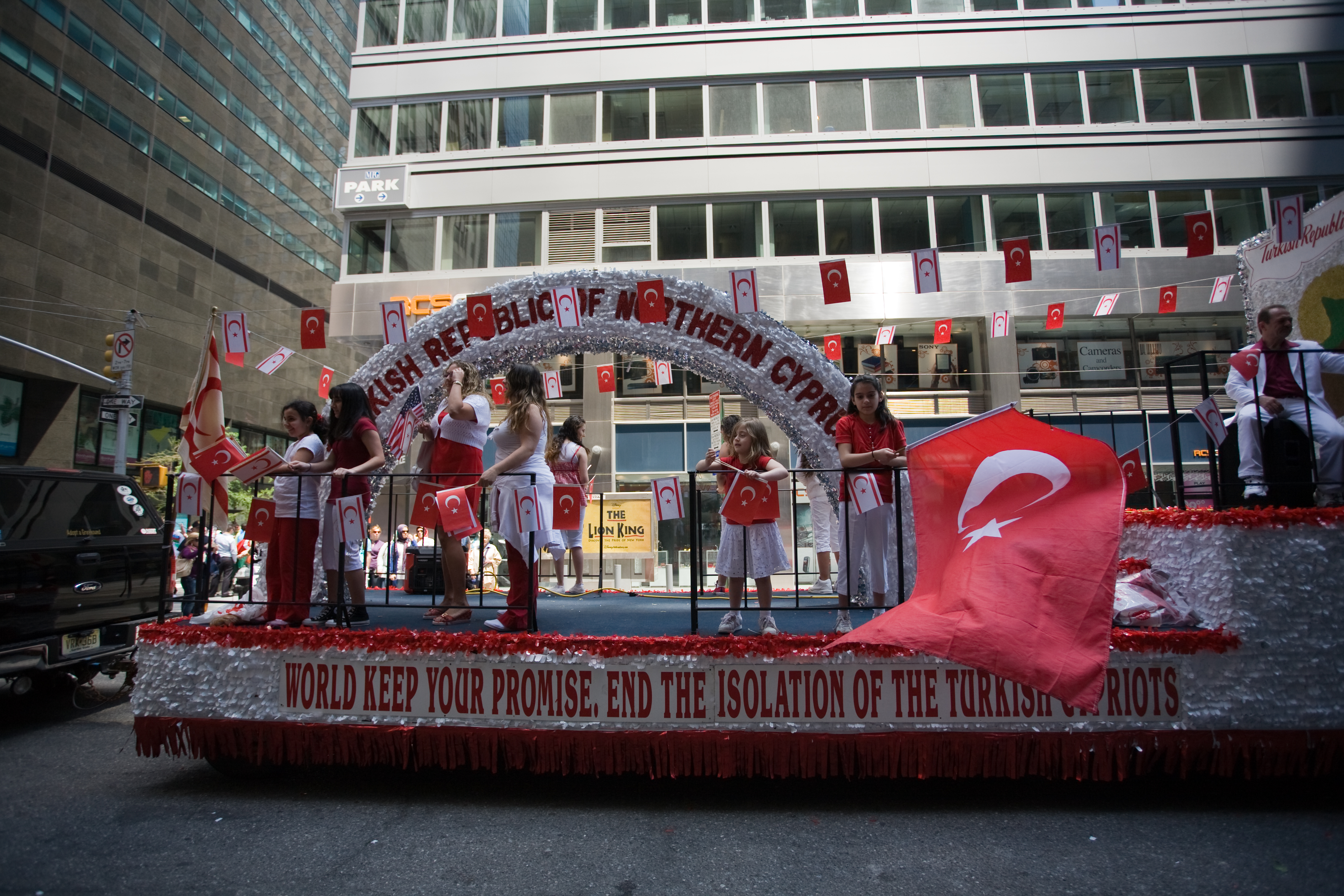
Turkish Cypriot Americans in New York City supporting for the recognition of the Turkish Republic of Northern Cyprus.

The Turkish Cypriots first arrived in the United States between 1820 and 1860 due to religious or political persecution. About 2,000 Turkish Cypriots had arrived in the United States between 1878-1923 when the Ottoman Empire handed over the administration of the island of Cyprus to Britain. Turkish Cypriot immigration to the United States continued between the 1960s till 1974 as a result of the Cyprus conflict. According to the 1980 United States census 1,756 people stated Turkish Cypriot ancestry. However, a further 2,067 people of Cypriot ancestry did not specify whether they were of Turkish or Greek Cypriot origin. On October 2, 2012, the first "Turkish Cypriot Day" was celebrated at the US Congress.

== See also ==
- Turks in the United Kingdom
  - British Cypriots
- Turkish American
  - Cypriot American
- Turkish Australian
- Turkish Canadian
- Association of Turkish Cypriots Abroad (ATCA)

== Bibliography ==
- Ansari, Humayun (2004), The Infidel Within: Muslims in Britain since 1800, C. Hurst & Co. Publishers, ISBN 978-1-85065-685-2.
- Atasoy, Ahmet (2011), "Kuzey Kıbrıs Türk Cumhuriyeti'nin Nüfus Coğrafyası" (PDF), Mustafa Kemal Üniversitesi Sosyal Bilimler Enstitüsü Dergisi, 8 (15): 29–62
- Bridgwood, Ann (1995), "Dancing the Jar: Girls' Dress and Turkish Cypriot Weddings", in Eicher, Joanne Bubolz (ed.), Dress and Ethnicity: Change Across Space and Time, Berg Publishers, ISBN 978-1-85973-003-4.
- Cahit, Neriman (2014), Brides for Sale, Turkish Cypriot Association of University Women, ISBN 9789963737345
- Cassia, Paul Sant (2007), Bodies of Evidence: Burial, Memory, and the Recovery of Missing Persons in Cyprus, Berghahn Books, ISBN 978-1-84545-228-5.
- Cleland, Bilal (2001), "The History of Muslims in Australia", in Saeed, Abdullah; Akbarzadeh, Shahram (eds.), Muslim Communities in Australia, University of New South Wales, ISBN 0-86840-580-9.
- Heper, Metin; Criss, Bilge (2009), Historical Dictionary of Turkey, Scarecrow Press, ISBN 978-0810860650.
- Hüssein, Serkan (2007), Yesterday & Today: Turkish Cypriots of Australia, Serkan Hussein, ISBN 978-0-646-47783-1.
- Keser, Ulvi (2006), "Kıbrıs'ta Göç Hareketleri ve 1974 Sonrasında Yaşananlar" (PDF), Çağdaş Türkiye Araştırmaları Dergisi, 12 (Spring 2006): 103–129
- Nevzat, Altay (2005), Nationalism Amongst the Turks of Cyprus: The First Wave (PDF), Oulu University Press, ISBN 9514277503.
- Panayiotopoulos, Prodromos; Dreef, Marja (2002), "London: Economic Differentiation and Policy Making", in Rath, Jan (ed.), Unravelling the rag trade: immigrant entrepreneurship in seven world cities, Berg Publishers, ISBN 978-1-85973-423-0.
- Papadakis, Yiannis; Peristianis, Nicos; Welz, Gisela (2006), Divided Cyprus: Modernity, History, and an Island in Conflict, Bloomington: Indiana University Press, ISBN 0-253-21851-9.
- St. John-Jones, L.W. (1983), Population of Cyprus: Demographic Trends and Socio-economic Influences, Maurice Temple Smith Ltd, ISBN 0851172326.
- Yilmaz, Ihsan (2005), Muslim Laws, Politics and Society in Modern Nation States: Dynamic Legal Pluralisms in England, Turkey and Pakistan, Ashgate Publishing, ISBN 0-7546-4389-1.
- Strüder, Inge R. (2003), Do concepts of ethnic economies explain existing minority enterprises? The Turkish speaking economies in London (PDF), London School of Economics, ISBN 0-7530-1727-X
- Tocci, Nathalie (2004), EU accession dynamics and conflict resolution: catalysing peace or consolidating partition in Cyprus?, Ashgate Publishing, ISBN 0-7546-4310-7.
