= Khalil Nur Khalil =

Nigerian economist (born 1992)

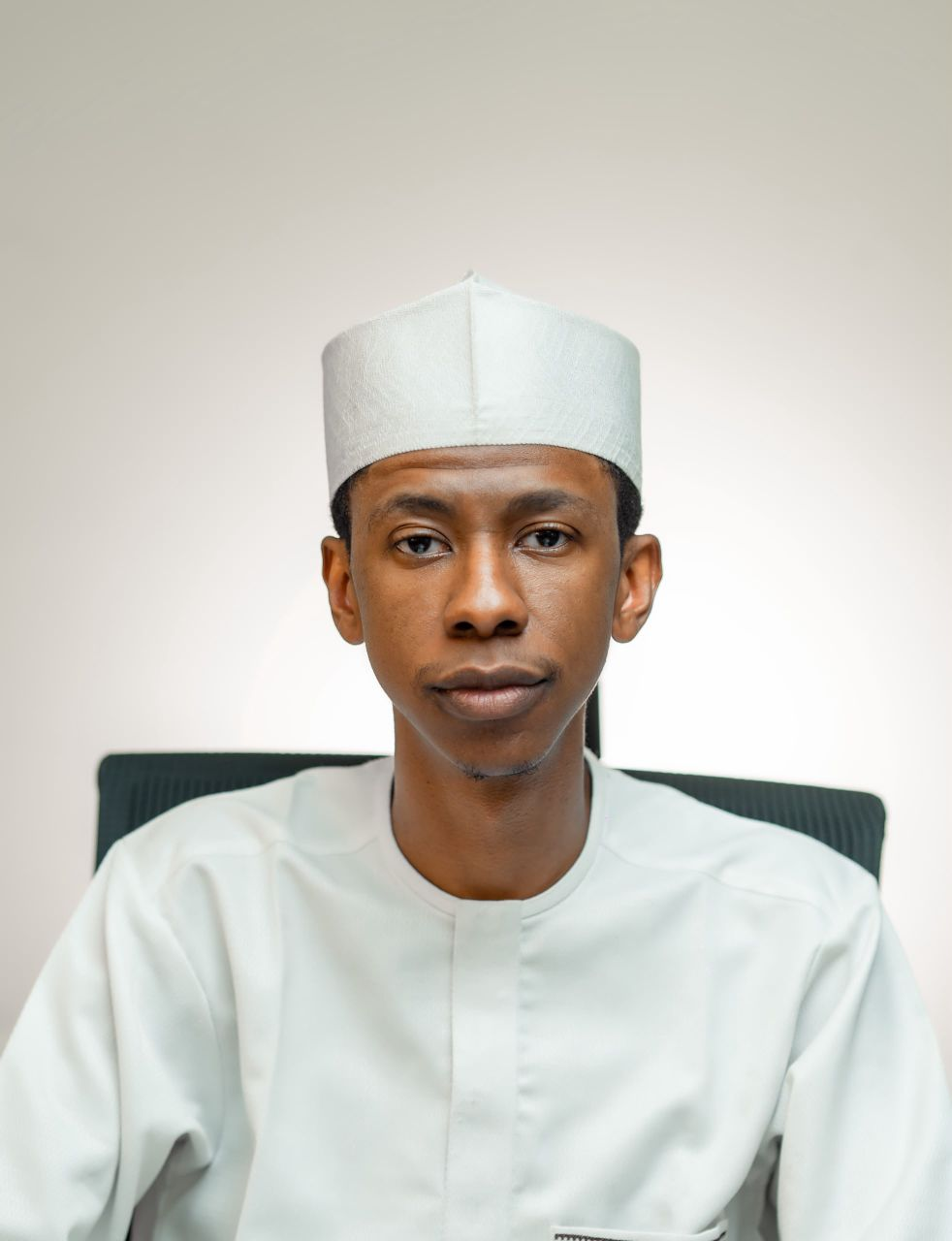
- Born: Khalil Nur Khalil; November 18, 1992 (age 33); Kaduna State
- Citizenship: Nigeria
- Education: Kaduna International School; British International School, Lagos; Glenalmond College, Scotland
- Occupations: Economist, public administrator
- Years active: 2018-present
- Employer(s): Kaduna Investment Promotion Agency, [lKatsina State Government
- Known for: Investment promotion and economic development
- Title: Executive Secretary, Kaduna Investment Promotion Agency, Economic Adviser to the Governor of Katsina State

Khalil Nur Khalil (born 18 November 1992) is a Nigerian economist, public administrator, and investment promotion professional. He serves as the Economic Adviser to the Governor of Katsina State. He previously has served as the Executive Secretary of the Kaduna Investment Promotion Agency (KADIPA) since October 2021. Before his appointment, he held several positions within the agency, including Director of Investment Intelligence and Acting Head of Investor Relations.

== Early life and education ==
Khalil was born in Kaduna State, Nigeria. He attended Kaduna International School for his primary education before completing his International General Certificate of Secondary Education (IGCSE) at the British International School, Lagos. He later studied A-Levels at Glenalmond College in Perth, Scotland.

He obtained a First Class Honours degree in Economics from Mediterranean University in Famagusta, North Cyprus, where he graduated as the best student in the Department of Economics.

== Career ==
Following his graduation in 2017, Khalil returned to Nigeria for the National Youth Service Corps (NYSC) programme and was posted to the Kaduna Investment Promotion Agency(KADIPA) as a Technical Assistant in the Investor Relations Department. During his service year, he participated in initiatives aimed at improving the state's business environment and assisted in the organisation of the Kaduna Economic and Investment Summit (KADINVEST).

After completing the NYSC programme, he remained with KADIPA as Technical Assistant to the Executive Secretary. He later served as Manager and Acting Head of Investor Relations, where he was involved in investor engagement and investment facilitation activities.

In March 2021, Khalil was appointed Director of Investment Intelligence, overseeing research, policy analysis, and investment strategy within the agency. On 11 October 2021, he was appointed Executive Secretary of KADIPA by Governor Nasir El-Rufai.

As Executive Secretary, Khalil has overseen initiatives intended to strengthen Kaduna State's investment promotion efforts, enhance investor services, and support the agency's digital engagement with prospective investors. He has also served on state committees and advisory bodies concerned with investment and economic development.
