= Doğuş Özokutan =

Turkish Cypriot filmmaker (born 1984)

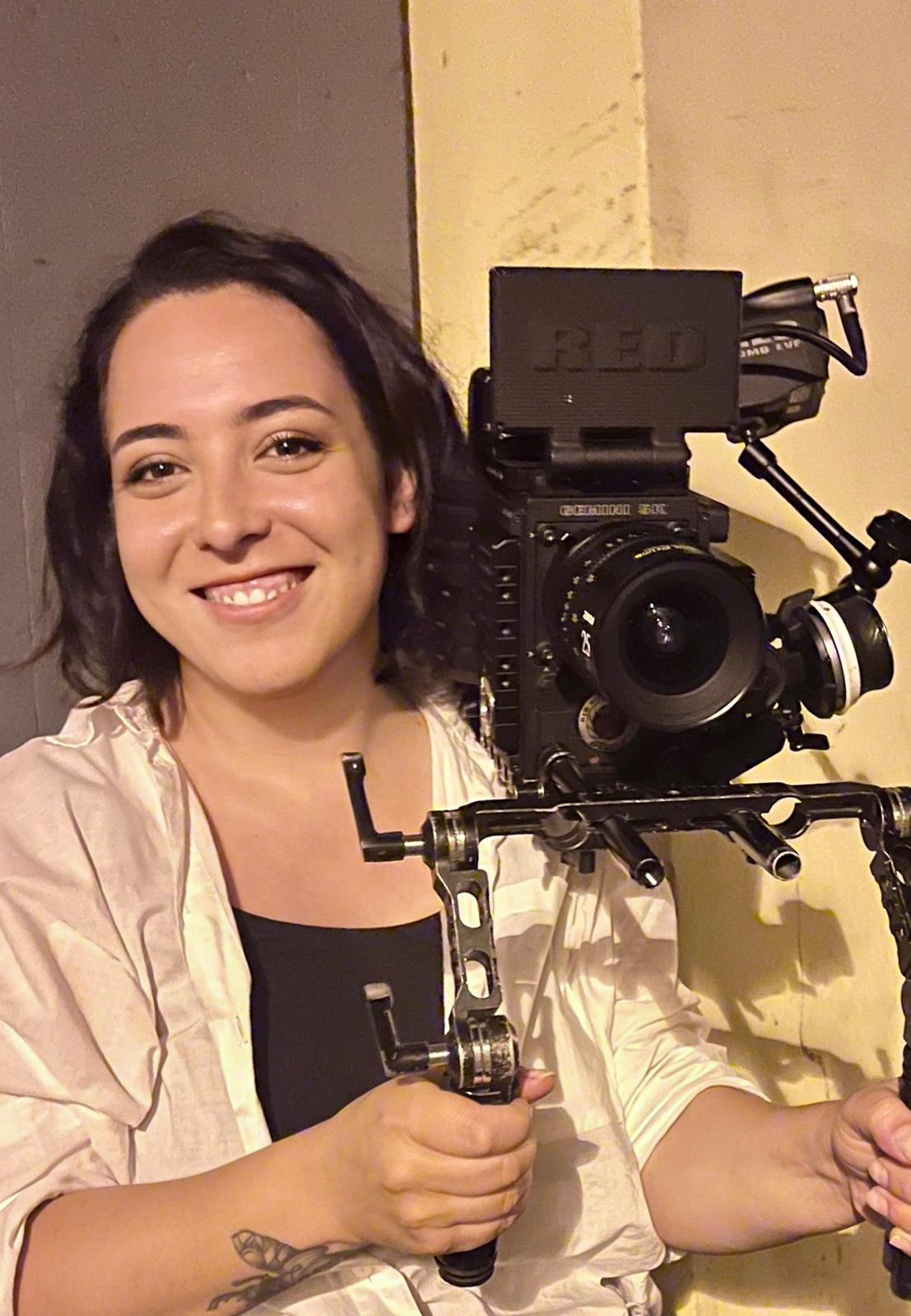
- Born: Doğuş Özokutan; 1984 (age 41–42); Nicosia, Cyprus
- Occupation: Filmmaker
- Years active: 2006–present
- Spouse: Vasvi Çiftcioğlu

Doğuş Özokutan (born in 1984., in Nicosia, Cyprus) is a Turkish Cypriot film director, scriptwriter and film producer based in Cyprus. Her short films explore themes of death, destiny, and choices with a dark-humoristic touch.

== Professional career ==
Her first short film, "Random Attempts" (2015) besides national festivals, competed in 41 international festivals, received three awards and a nomination for Best Film at the Oscars Qualifying Short Shorts & Asia 2016.

Her second short film, "Kismet" (2018), besides national festivals has been screened in 43 countries and garnered numerous audience award nominations, including at the BAFTA Qualifying Leeds International Film Festival 2018. Özokutan's animated short documentary, "The Shepherd," completed in 2020, screened in Portugal, Turkey, and US where it won the Bronze Remi Award at Worldfest Houston.

Her fourth short film, "The Delivery" (2020) had 65 festival screenings and eight awards worldwide, including two awards from GOYA Qualifying festivals. Premiered at the 38th Torino Film Festival, "The Delivery" became an official selection at numerous festivals, such as the Oscar Qualifying 45th Cleveland Film Festival and 21st Cine de Lebu. "The Delivery" officially selected to 8 GOYA accredited festivals in total. The film also become official selection at the Columbus International Film & Animation Festival.

Özokutan earned her MFA degree in Visual Arts at Eastern Mediterranean University. She also attended Film Development classes led by Kathleen McInnis and participated in a 9-month Film Production Workshop guided by Zeynep Atakan. Her short films have been showcased in over 150 festivals worldwide, including the OSCAR, BAFTA, and GOYA accredited festivals such as the Torino Film Festival, Leeds International Film Festival, Short Shorts & Asia Film Festival, Cleveland International Film Festival, Elche International Independent Film Festival, and Cine de Lebu Film Festival. Across her four short films, she won 13 international awards.

== Filmography ==
Films
Year	Name	Position				Genre	Notes
Year	Name	Director	Scriptwriter	Editor	Producer	Genre	Notes
2020	The Delivery	Yes	Yes	Yes	Yes	Short Fiction	
2020	The Shepherd	Yes	Yes	Yes	Yes	Short animation & documentary	Together with Vasvi Çiftcioğlu
2018	Kismet	Yes	Yes	No	Yes	Short Fiction	Together with Vasvi Çiftcioğlu
2015	Random Attempts	Yes	Yes	No	Yes	Short Fiction	Together with Vasvi Çiftcioğlu
2009	Özker Özgür	No	No	Yes	No	Documentary	Together with Vasvi Çiftcioğlu
2008	Öte(de)ki	Yes	No	Yes	No	Documentary	
2006	Yasemin Kokan Şeher	Yes	No	No	No	Documentary	

== Awards ==
Olağan Denemeler / Random Attempts (2015, short fiction): Writer, Co-director & Producer

- Platinum Remi Award - Comedy-Black/Dark – 48th Worldfest-Houston International Film Festival, April 2015, USA
- Winner – 3rd Seattle Turkish Film Festival, November 2015, USA
- Special Mention – 5th Macaé Cine – Festival Internacional de Cinema de Macaé, November 2015, Brazil

Kısmet / Kismet(2018, short fiction): Writer, Co-director & Producer

- Audience Award – 9th Brazil Cinefest, December 2018, Brazil

Çoban / The Shepherd (2020, short animation): Writer, Co-director & Producer

- Bronze Remi – 53rd Worldfest-Houston International Film Festival, April 2020, USA

Teslimat / The Delivery (2020, short fiction): Writer, Director, Co-producer

- Audience Award – 74th Festival Internazionale del Cinema di Salerno, December 2020, Italy
- Best Short Film & Best Actor – 12th Festival de Cine Europeo de Puerto Rico, December 2021, Puerto Rico)
- Best Social Short Film – 15th Festival Internacional de Cine de Sax [GOYA qualifying], July 2021, Spain
- Best International Short Film – 44th Festival Internacional de Cine Independiente de Elche [GOYA qualifying], July 2021, Spain.
- Best Actor – 18th FECISO – Festival de Cine Social de Castilla-La Mancha, October 2021, Spain.
- Best Actor Dramatic Performance in a Foreign Language Short – 36th Fort Lauderdale International Film Festival, December 2021, USA.
- Best Narrative Short Film – 19th Festival de Cine y Derechos Humanos de Barcelona, December 2021, Spain
