= Bohdan Kulakowski =

Polish-American mechanical engineer

Bohdan Kulakowski (23 June 1942 – 22 March 2006) was a professor of mechanical engineering at the Pennsylvania State University Department of Mechanical and Nuclear Engineering. Kulakowski was an internationally recognized expert in automatic control systems, computer simulations and control of industrial processes, systems dynamics, vehicle/road dynamic interaction and transportation systems. His fuzzy logic algorithm for avoiding skidding accidents was recognized in 2000 by Discover magazine as one of its top 10 technological innovations of the year.

Kulakowski received his master's degree from Warsaw Technical University and his doctoral degree from the Polish Academy of Sciences in Warsaw. He held several management positions in Polish research institutions, including head of the Process Control Division in the Computer Centre for Building Industry and of the Division of Automatic Control research group, Institute of Glass and Ceramics, both in Warsaw. He was also a lecturer in electrical engineering at Warsaw Technical University and in 1974 held a United Nations postdoctoral position at the University of York in the United Kingdom.

Kulakowski moved to Penn State in 1979 as a senior Fulbright Scholar in mechanical engineering. He became a member of the university faculty in 1982 and served as head of the Pennsylvania Transportation Institute (PTI) from 1992 to 2003.

He was highly regarded for his teaching at Penn State, winning numerous awards. His honors include the university's George W. Atherton Award for Excellence in Teaching, the Penn State Engineering Society (PSES) Outstanding Teaching Award and the PSES Premier Teaching Award.

His professional affiliations include the American Society of Mechanical Engineers (ASME), the Society of Automotive Engineers, the American Society for Testing and Materials and the Pi Tau Sigma mechanical engineering honor society. Kulakowski was a Fellow of ASME and secretary of the International Forum for Road Transportation Technology.

He was hit from behind while riding his bicycle and killed by a legally blind person driving a van.
