= Kaduna Investment Promotion Agency =

State owned agency

- Abbreviation: KADIPA

Agency overview
- Formed: 2015

Jurisdictional structure
- Federal agency (Operations jurisdiction): Nigeria
- Operations jurisdiction: Nigeria
- Legal jurisdiction: Kaduna Investment Promotion Agency
- Governing body: Kaduna State Government
- Constituting instrument: The provisions of the Kaduna State Law 2015 in Sections 4 consolidated the establishment of the KADIPA for operation in a democratic system of Government.
- General nature: Federal law enforcement

Operational structure
- Headquarters: Sokoto Rd, Doka, Tudun Nupawa 800213, Kaduna, Nigeria Kaduna
- Agency executive: Sadiq Muhammed, Executive Chairman

Website
- https://kadipa.kdsg.gov.ng/

Kaduna Investment Promotion Agency is a state owned government agency of Kaduna State Government. It was established by Law 17 under section 4 of Kaduna State law with the responsibility to initiate, facilitate and coordinate the investment in the state through Public Private Partnership, Privatisation, Commercialisation of state owned assets build, operate and transfer.

== History and functions ==
In accordance with the provisions of the Kaduna State Law, Sections 4(17), the agency is mandated to drive economic growth, promotes policies, develops frameworks, articulates growth strategies, and fosters sustainable growth. The Agency advises on investment projects, sources finance, monitors project implementation, promotes opportunities, and serves as a one-stop centre for investment activities. These functions aim to create a competitive business climate, attract investments, and promote economic growth in Kaduna State, ultimately enhancing the state's economic development and job creation. By working together, the Agency and Board strive to achieve the state's economic goals and improve the lives of its citizens.

== Leadership ==
The Kaduna State Investment Promotion Agency is headed by the deputy governor of the state who shall serve as the chairman of the agency and the Executive Secretary of Kaduna Investment Promotion Agency shall serve as the Secretary.

1. Khalil Nur Khalil was appointed as the Executive Secretary by Mallam Nasir El-Rufai in 2021.
2. Mr. Sadiq Muhammed (Executive Secretary)
