= Oluwami Dosunmu-Ogunbi =

Nigerian-American roboticist, engineer and educator

- Citizenship: American
- Education: University of Illinois Urbana-Champaign (BSc); University of Michigan Ann Arbor (MSE); University of Michigan Ann Arbor (MS); University of Michigan Ann Arbor (PhD)
- Occupations: Educator, Roboticist
- Known for: First Black woman to obtain a PhD in Robotics
- Title: Robotics Engineer
- Parents: Dr Adedoyin Dosunmu Ogunbi (father); Dr Sesi Dosunmu Ogunbi (mother)
- Website: wamiogunbi.com

Oluwami Dosunmu-Ogunbi is a Nigerian American roboticist, engineer, and educator. She is the first Black woman to earn a Ph.D. in Robotics from the University of Michigan.

== Life and career ==
=== Family and educational background ===
Oluwami was born to Nigerian immigrant parents, Adedoyin Dosunmu Ogunbi, and Sesi Dosunmu Ogunbi. Oluwami's father is a medical director at Duchess International Hospital, Lagos Nigeria and an assistant professor at the University of Alabama Birmingham her mother, Sesi is a pediatric gastroenterology specialist.

Oluwami earned her bachelor's degree in mechanical engineering from the University of Illinois Urbana-Champaign, graduating with honours in 2017. She then pursued advanced studies at the University of Michigan Ann Arbor, obtaining a master's degree in mechanical engineering in 2020, followed by a master's degree and Ph.D. in robotics in 2021 and 2024.

==== Career ====
Oluwami served as a graduate student instructor at the University of Michigan from 2019 to 2020. She was also lead engineering learning assistant for the Illinois Engineering First-Year Experience (IEFX) program and served as sand casting chair for Pi Tau Sigma, the mechanical engineering honour society. She has also been a student mentor and leader in the Morrill Engineering Program, which focuses on empowering African American, Hispanic, and Native American engineering students. Oluwami is currently a visiting assistant professor in the Mechanical Engineering Department at Rose-Hulman Institute of Technology. On April 6, 2024, Oluwami was inducted into the Edward Alexander Bouchet Graduate Honor Society (Bouchet Society), named as the first African American doctoral recipient in the United States (Physics, Yale University, 1876).

== Works ==
=== Academic publications ===
- Terrain-adaptive, alip-based bipedal locomotion controller via model predictive control and virtual constraints
- Stair climbing using the angular momentum linear inverted pendulum model and model predictive control
- Demonstrating a Robust Walking Algorithm for Underactuated Bipedal Robots in Non-flat, Non-stationary Environments

== Awards ==
Oluwami has received numerous award, fellowship and other honours among them are:

- Paul E. Parker Award (2016)
- Mechanical Engineering Pi Tau Sigma MVP Award (2016)
- Janet Eakman Award for Excellence (2017)
- Rackham Merit Fellowship (2017)
- GEM Fellowship ( 2017)
- Willie Hobbs Moore Achievement Award (2022)
- Ford Foundation Pre-Doctoral Fellowship (Honourable Mention - 2022)
- Engineering Innovation Runner-Up in the 3 Minute Thesis Competition (2023)
- MLK Spirit Award for Mentoring and Inspiration (2024)
