= Halil Güven =

Turkish academic (born 1956)

Halil M. Guven
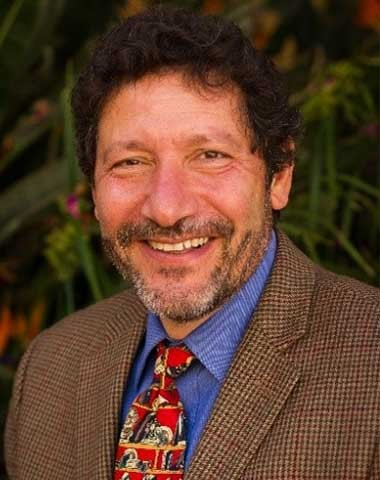
- Born: November 16, 1956 (age 69); Cyprus
- Scientific career
- Workplaces: San Diego State University Georgia; Istanbul Bilgi University; Boğaziçi University; Mississippi State University; University of Houston; Eastern Mediterranean University; Bahçeşehir University

Halil Guven (Halil Güven, in Turkish) is a Cypriot-born professor, currently serving as the Dean of San Diego State University - Georgia. He was a Vice Dean of SDSU Georgia for four years before then and was one of the coordinators of the project at the time of its conception. Dr. Güven served as a Rector at three different universities in Turkey and in Cyprus. He served as the rector of Istanbul Bilgi University appointed in the academic year of 2009–2010, Eastern Mediterranean University (EMU), North Cyprus in 2004–2007, and Bahçeşehir University, Istanbul, Turkey in 1999–2003.

== Education ==
He received his B.S. degree from Boğaziçi University (Istanbul, 1978), his M.S. degree from Mississippi State University on Fulbright Scholarship (1981), and his Ph.D. degree from University of Houston, in Mechanical Engineering(1983).

== Career ==
Alongside his 20+ articles in energy systems in peer-reviewed journals, Güven has edited books and published book chapters on Globalization, Leadership, Clash of civilizations and Education. He speaks Turkish, English, and moderate Spanish and Greek.

=== San Diego State University ===
Dr. Güven worked as an assistant professor (1984–1988), associate professor (1988–1994), and as a professor (1994–1999) at San Diego State University. In 1995-1997 he was the Director of International Development, College of Extended Studies, at San Diego State University. He founded and directed two important centers at San Diego State University, namely the Energy Engineering Institute (EEI) (1986) on applied energy research for industrial and manufacturing facilities, and the Industrial Assessment Center (1990), financially supported by the US Department of Energy (USDOE), on evaluating energy usage by small to medium size industrial facilities. His work at EEI received ‘Energy Innovation Award’ from the US Department of Energy (1988). He served as vice-president for two terms (1988, 1989) and as president (1993) at Association of Energy Engineers (AEE), San Diego Chapter. Among many other awards, Prof. Güven received Energy Professional Development Award from AEE (1987), Teetor Educator Award from SAE (Society of Automotive Engineers) (1992), and Distinguished Engineering Educator Award from San Diego Engineering Societies (1993) in recognition of “devoted services to the Engineering Profession and Community.”

=== Bahçeşehir University ===
Prof. Güven relocated to Turkey for the position of rector at the newly founded Bahçeşehir University, where he served for four years as the Founding Rector (1999–2003). At Bahçeşehir University, he established the International Institute of Leadership and Public Affairs (IILPA), and the first School of Government in Turkey, and received a Leadership Chair from UNESCO. During Dr. Güven's tenure as a rector, Bahçeşehir University gained wide acceptance within the Turkish higher education sector as an innovative university.

=== Eastern Mediterranean University ===
Between 2004 and 2007, Prof. Güven served as the Rector of Eastern Mediterranean University (EMU) in North Cyprus, where he increased the international recognizability of EMU—the biggest university of the island with over 15.000 students from 65 countries, situated in an internationally unrecognized territory. During Prof. Güven's tenure as a rector, EMU gained acceptance into UNESCO's “International Handbook of World Universities”, became a full member of European Universities Association (EUA), completed EUA's Institutional Evaluation Program, and received ABET (US) accreditation for its engineering programs. In addition, at EMU, Dr. Güven established Centers of Excellence in Conflict Resolution, Peace Journalism and Woman Studies.

=== Istanbul Bilgi University ===
Dr. Güven was appointed as the rector of Istanbul Bilgi University in 2009.

=== San Diego State University Georgia ===
Currently, in a capacity as the Dean of SDSU Georgia, Dr. Güven oversees successful management of the project, completion of the planned activities, essential commitments and pursues a wide range of new initiatives. He enforces the policies and regulations adopted by the Board of Trustees, the Office of the SDSU President, the SDSU Faculty Senate, and SDSU faculty. Dr. Güven is also responsible for communicating the vision and goals of SDSU-Georgia collaborative to community and professional constituencies and seeking public and private funds to support the goals of the program. He is involved in the engagement of private donors and developing the policies and plans for the sustainability of the project. He is also responsible for directing efforts to support the achievement of relevant partner university program accreditation (ABET, ACS, WASC, etc.).

== Honors and recognition ==
Dr. Güven has received many awards and recognition over the years. These include the International Who's Who award of professionals (1996), Distinguished Engineering Educator Award, San Diego Engineering Societies (SDES, 1993), Teetor Education Award (national), Society of Automotive Engineers (SAE, 1992), SDSU Meritorious Performance and Professional Promise Award (1990), Energy Professional Development Award (international), Association of Energy Engineers (AEE, 1987), Energy Professional Development Award (AEE, 1986), and the local Energy Professional Development award in 1985, ARCO Outstanding Student Award in 1981. He has also been a member of PI TAU Sigma Honor Society since 1980. He was a beneficiary of Rice-Cullimore Scholarship, ASME Aux., Inc., I 1979–80, and Fulbright Travel Grant in 1979. He has also received numerous Project Awards, including the most recent - Energy Innovation in Technology Transfer. He is also a recipient of three teaching awards and maintains active participation in professional associations.

== Research Interests ==
Dr. Güven's research interests include Sustainability and Building Energy Efficiency, Civilization Harmony, Technology Transfer in Curriculum Design, University Administration, Energy Systems Optimization, Energy Efficiency, Solar Energy, Power Plant Engineering. He has served as a consultant to: San Diego Gas & Electric, General Dynamics, Computer Sciences Corporation, Government of Turkey, Turkish Electricity Authority, California Energy Commission, TEKTRA (Technology Transfer Corporation). He secured a National Science Foundation grant to build an instructional power plant at SDSU, set up the Energy Engineering Institute in 1986 to facilitate students’ insertion into the professional field through joint university-industry graduation projects, In 1991, received initial funding from the U.S. Department of Energy for establishing the SDSU Energy Analysis and Diagnostic Center. He has acquired a total or $17,493,739 in 22 different project contracts/grants.

== Works ==
Edited books

- Globalization and the Third World: A Study of Negative Consequences, Eds. B.N. Ghosh and H. Güven, Macmillan Palgrave, 2006.
- Leadership and Human Development, Eds. A. Safty and H. Güven, The International Leadership Series, Universal Publishers, 2002. (Also published by Bahçesehir University Press (istanbul) as New Paradigms in Leadership, Eds. A. Safty and H. Güven, 2003.)

Chapters in books

- U. Atikol and H. Güven, Energy Efficiency: Developing Countries, a chapter in Encyclopedia of Energy Engineering & Technology, Ed. B. Capehart, Taylor and Francis, 3 Volume Set, CRC Press, July 2007.
- H. Güven, Globalization and Clash of Civilizations, a chapter in Globalization and the Third World: A Study of Negative Consequences, Eds. Ghosh and Güven, Macmillan Palgrave, 2006.
- H. Güven, Civilizations and Natural laws: A Positive Sciences Perspective; a chapter in Leadership And Human Development, Eds. Safty and Güven, (pp. 289–305) Universal Publishers, The International Leadership Series, 2002.
- H. Güven, Dialogue of Civilizations: Paradigms for Economic Development and Social Advancement; a chapter in Leadership and Human Development, Eds. Safty and Güven, (pp. 306– 321) Universal Publishers, The International Leadership Series, 2002.
- H. Güven, Leadership in Education: Bahçesehir University – An intercultural Model in Progress; a chapter in Leadership and Human Development, Eds. Safty and Güven, (pp. 322–356) Universal Publishers, The Int. Leadership Series, 2002.
- H. Guven and R.B. Bannerot, A Comprehensive Methodology for the Analysis and Design of Parabolic Trough Collectors for Solar Energy Applications in India, a chapter in Progress in Solar Engineering, Ed. Yogi Goswami, Hemisphere Publishing Corp., New York, N.Y., 1986.
