= Ebru Polat =

Turkish singer

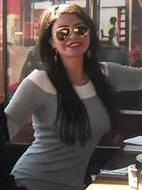
- Ebru Polat in 2015

Background information
- Birth name: Filiz Sarıkaya
- Born: 30 June 1983 (age 41); İzmir, Turkey
- Genres: Pop
- Occupation(s): Singer, lawyer
- Years active: 2007–present
- Labels: DFM Productions; Seyhan; Dokuz Sekiz; Musicom
- Website: ebrupolat.com

Ebru Polat (born Filiz Sarıkaya, 30 June 1983) is a Turkish pop music singer.

== Early life ==
Ebru Polat was born on 30 June 1983 in İzmir. She took ballet lessons at a young age. While in primary school, Polat joined the choir of her school, but as she grew older she decided to study law. In 2005, she finished her studies at Eastern Mediterranean University School of Law. She briefly worked in a law institution before enrolling in Üsküdar University to get a master's degree in psychology.

== Music career ==
Polat started her music career in 2007 by releasing an EP titled Çetin Ceviz. As she started to pursue a career in music, Polat moved to London and studied music at the Royal Academy of Arts. Upon returning to Turkey, she released her second EP Çok Geç in 2008. The EP's lead single, also titled "Çok Geç", was written and composed by Sezen Aksu. She also covered Aksu's "Seni Yerler" in this EP. In 2009, she released her debut studio album Kalp Ayazı. The album contained songs written and composed by Serdar Ortaç, Fettah Can, Murat Güneş, and Sezen Aksu. Polat also wrote and composed the song "Delikanlı Kız" for this album.

Her second studio album Dinle 2011 was released in 2011. Among the songs she covered for this album were "Haydi Git" (written by Sezen Aksu), "Mutlu Ol Yeter" and "Artık Sevmeyeceğim". By the end of 2011, she released the single "Olanlar Oldu". This was followed by another single titled "Kaçın Kurasıyım" in 2012. For this single, she covered the song "Hani Dünya Tatlısı", written by Aysel Gürel and composed Mehmet Erbil Savaş. In 2013, she released two singles: "Günaha Davet" and "Hediyem Olsun". After releasing covering the song "Çilli Bom" in 2015, Polat released her third studio album 9 Hit in April. The album contained songs written and composed by Serdar Ortaç, Altan Çetin, Onurr, Alper Narman, Murat Güneş, Gökhan Tümkaya, Hüseyin Cebişci and Efe Demiryoğuran. Since 2015, she has continued her career by releasing singles, most of which have been written and composed by herself.

== Discography ==
=== Albums ===
- Kalp Ayazı (2009) _{Seyhan Müzik}
- Dinle 2011 (2011) _{Dokuz Sekiz Müzik}
- 9 Hit (2015) _{Seyhan Müzik}

=== EPs ===
- Çok Geç (2008) _{Seyhan Müzik}
- Çetin Ceviz (2007) _{DFM Productions}

=== Singles ===
- "Olanlar Oldu" (2011) _{Dokuz Sekiz Müzik}
- "Kaçın Kurasıyım" (2012) _{Musicom Müzik}
- "Günaha Davet" (2013) _{Musicom Müzik}
- "Hediyem Olsun" (2014) _{Musicom Müzik}
- "İnat" (with İlkan Günüç) (2014) _{Star Odasi Prodüksiyon}
- "Çilli Bom" (2015) _{Musicom Müzik}
- "Dokun Bana" (2016) _{Seyhan Müzik}
- "Hava Çok Sıcak" (2017) _{Seyhan Müzik}
- "Hazmedemeyenlere Soda" (2018) _{Seyhan Müzik}
- "Akşam Sendeyiz Kraliçe" (2018) _{Seyhan Müzik}
- "Madam" (2019) _{Kemal Aslan Music Production}
- "Anlayacaksın" (2019) _{Avrupa Müzik}
- "Çıngıraklı" (2020) _{Ebru Polat Production}
- "İzmir Lokumu" (2020) _{Ebru Polat Production}
- "Anlat" (2021) _{Ebru Polat Production}
- "Herkese Günaydın" (2021) _{Ebru Polat Production}
- "Sol Yanım" (with Erol Özdamar) (2022) _{Grand Müzik}
- "Hokkabaz" (2022) _{Grand Müzik}

Duets

- "5 Karat" (with Selin Ciğerci) (2018) _{Seyhan Müzik}
- "Haydi Şimdi Gel" (with Halil Vergin) (2019) _{Dinç Müzik}
- "Tren" (with Evren Adam) (2020) _{DMC}
