= Latchi =

Latchi Λατσί Latsi
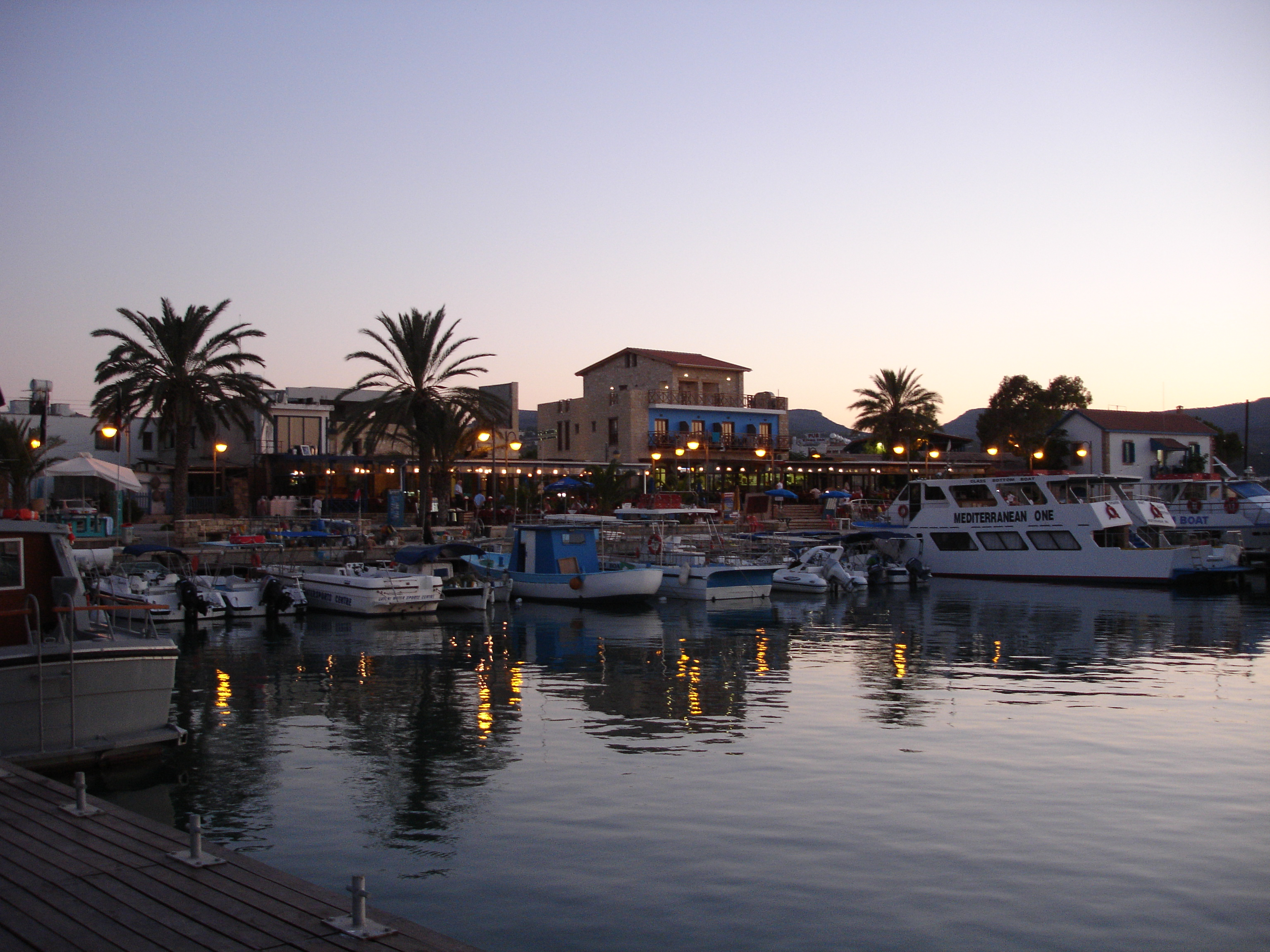
- Latchi Harbour

- Location in Cyprus
- Coordinates: 35°2′17″N 32°23′37″E
- Country: Cyprus
- District: Paphos District
- Municipality: Polis
- Elevation: 23 ft (7 m)
- Time zone: UTC+2 (EET)
  - Summer (DST): UTC+3 (EEST)
- Postal code: 8840

Latchi (Greek: Λατσί), also spelled Lachi, Latsi or Lakki, is a small fishing village within Polis, a municipality in Cyprus. It is known for its small marina, fresh seafood tavernas, and close proximity to the Akamas Peninsula National Park and the Blue Lagoon.

== Altitude ==
Latchi is located at an altitude of 7 meters above sea level.

== History ==
Latchi was once a small port exporting mainly carobs. The old stone-built carob warehouses have now been converted into restaurants, fish taverns and recreational areas. Small cruises to Akamas depart from Latchi. It has also recently been expanded and accommodates 220 pleasure boats.
