= Phoebus Dhrymes =

Cypriot American econometrician

Phoebus J. Dhrymes
- Born: October 1, 1932; Ktima, Cyprus
- Died: April 8, 2016 (aged 83)

Academic background
- Education: Massachusetts Institute of Technology; University of Texas at Austin
- Doctoral advisor: Evsey Domar
- Influences: Edwin Kuh; Robert Solow

Academic work
- Discipline: Econometrics
- Institutions: Columbia University

Phoebus James Dhrymes (October 1, 1932 – April 8, 2016) was a Cypriot American econometrician. He was a professor of economics at Columbia University. Dhrymes made substantial contributions to econometric theory through journal articles and textbooks.

Born on Cyprus, Dhrymes arrived in the United States in 1951, settling with relatives in New York City. After a few months, he volunteered to be drafted into the US Army for a two-year tour of duty, and afterwards attended the University of Texas at Austin on the G.I. Bill. In 1961 he earned his Ph.D. from Massachusetts Institute of Technology under supervision of Edwin Kuh and Robert Solow. He was appointed associate professor at the University of Pennsylvania in 1963 and became a full professor in 1967. Since 1973, he had been a professor at Columbia University.

He died on April 8, 2016.

== Selected publications ==
- Dhrymes, Phoebus J.; Friend, Irwin; Gultekin, N. Bulent (1984). "A Critical Reexamination of the Empirical Evidence on the Arbitrage Pricing Theory". Journal of Finance. 39 (2): 323–346. doi:10.1111/j.1540-6261.1984.tb02312.x.
- Dhrymes, Phoebus J. (1965). "Some Extensions and Tests for the CES Class of Production Functions". Review of Economics and Statistics. 47 (4): 357–366. doi:10.2307/1927764. JSTOR 1927764.
- Dhrymes, Phoebus J.; Kurz, Mordecai (1964). "Technology and Scale in Electricity Generation". Econometrica. 32 (3): 287–315. doi:10.2307/1913038. JSTOR 1913038.
