= Elayne Arrington =

American mathematician and engineer

- Born: c. 1940; Pittsburgh, Pennsylvania
- Education: University of Pittsburgh; University of Cincinnati
- Known for: First African American woman to graduate from the University of Pittsburgh's School of Engineering
- Scientific career
- Fields: Mathematics; Engineering
- Workplaces: Wright-Patterson Air Force Base; University of Pittsburgh
- Thesis: The P-Frattini Subgroup of a Finite Group (1974)
- Doctoral advisor: Donald B. Parker

Elayne Arrington (born c. 1940) is an American mathematician and engineer. She was the first African American woman to graduate with a bachelor's degree from the School of Engineering at the University of Pittsburgh. After earning her Ph.D., she went on to conduct performance analyses of Soviet Union aircraft at the Wright-Patterson Air Force Base.

== Early life and education ==
Elayne Arrington grew up in West Mifflin, Pennsylvania. She graduated from Homestead High School (now Steel Valley High School) in 1957 where she received the second-highest SAT score in mathematics (797 out of 800). Despite finishing first in her class, Elayne was denied the opportunity to deliver the valedictory address. Instead school administrators assigned the speech to the class president who was white and male.

Arrington was recommended for a full-ride scholarship to study mechanical engineering at the University of Pittsburgh. Still, the sponsor, the Mesta Machine Company, withdrew her scholarship, saying that the money had to be given to a man because women "do not finish engineering programs." In spite of that prediction, in 1961 Arrington became the first African-American woman to graduate from the University of Pittsburgh's School of Engineering. As a member of the engineering honorary Pi Tau Sigma. She discussed the nature of the obstacles she faced to Rouvalis.

"Some of [the barriers] may have been racial prejudice, but they didn't even have to get to racial because being a girl in engineering, being female, was enough."

Arrington went on to earn a master's degree in mathematics from the University of Dayton in Ohio, and while working on her master's Arrington, a Charles Phelps Taft Fellow, also took math courses at Oxford University. She earned her Ph.D. in math at the University of Cincinnati in 1974 with a thesis titled The P-Frattini Subgroup of a Finite Group, supervised by Donald B. Parker. She became the 17th African-American woman in the United States to earn a PhD in mathematics.

== Career ==
Arrington was hired as an aerospace engineer in the Foreign Technology Division at Wright-Patterson Air Force Base in Dayton, Ohio. At the base, she analyzed the performance of Soviet Union aircraft.

In 1974 with her newly earned doctorate, she returned to the University of Pittsburgh where she taught in the department of mathematics and statistics. Arrington cut back her work schedule in 2012, and fully retired from the university in 2018.

In 2007, she was named a Community College of Allegheny County board member.

In 2016, Arrington took a class at the Pittsburgh Theological Seminary in New Testament Greek "so she could read the Bible in its original language." She pursued theological studies classes at the University of Pittsburgh and plans to complete her studies in 2021 at the age of 81, for another master's degree, this one in theological study.

== Awards ==
In April 2007, Arrington received a Distinguished Alumnus Award from the University of Pittsburgh's African American Alumni Council.
