= Zehra Şonya =

Turkish Cypriot sculptor

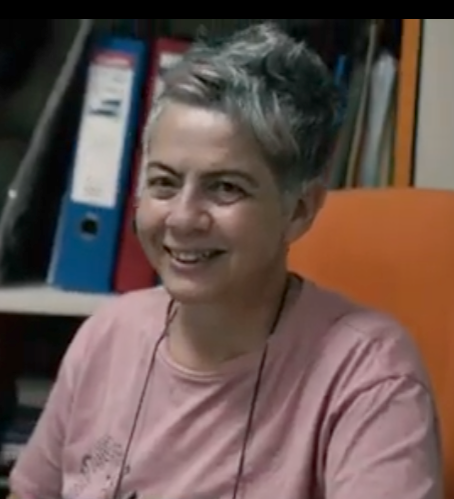
- In a 2021 video
- Born: 1972 (age 53–54); Limassol, Cyprus
- Education: Hacettepe University
- Occupations: Sculptor, academic

Zehra Şonya (born 1972) is a Cypriot sculptor and academic. She explores societal connections, communication through art, politics related to Northern Cyprus and feminism in her work.

== Life ==
Şonya was born in Limassol in 1972. She graduated from Anafartalar High School in Kyrenia in 1991. She received her Bachelor of Arts in 1997 from Hacettepe University and won the Achievement Award in the free sculpture competition organized the university's Faculty of Fine Arts and the Contemporary Sculptors Association. After completing her Master of Arts in 2001, also at Hacettepe University, Şonya returned to Cyprus where she taught elective sculpture courses in the Art History and Archaeology Department at Eastern Mediterranean University.

In 2003, she ran as a parliamentary candidate for Kyrenia from the Peace and Democracy Movement party. She worked as the Visual Arts Project Coordinator at Eastern Mediterranean University, and also served on the board of the European-Mediterranean Art Association (EMAA).

Şonya taught part time at the European University of Lefke in the Graphic Design Department from 2006 to 2008. She also served as the term president of the Mediterranean European Art Association from 2017 to 2019. Şonya is currently the Art Coordinator for the Visual Arts Archive in the Project at the Eastern Mediterranean University.

Şonya curated the exhibition Şinasi Tekman, the first Turkish Cypriot Sculptor and wrote the accompanying exhibition book in 2016.

In 2024, she coordinated an exhibition about Mevhibe Şefik, who was the first Turkish Cypriot woman art teacher.
