= Roger Linquist =

American businessman

Roger D. Linquist
- Born: June 26, 1938; Elmwood Park, Illinois, U.S.
- Died: September 16, 2015 (aged 77); Dallas, Texas, U.S.
- Known for: Co-founder of Metro PCS

Roger D. Linquist (June 26, 1938 – September 16, 2015) was an American businessman who was the chairman, chief executive officer and co-founder of Metro PCS. He also founded LJ Entertainment Inc in 1995.

== Early life ==
Raised by a single mother in Chicago, Illinois, Linquist studied mechanical engineering at Purdue University, graduating in 1961. He was a member of two national engineering honor societies, Pi Tau Sigma and Tau Beta Pi. He continued his graduate studies at the Rocket Propulsion Laboratory in the School of Mechanical Engineering, graduating in 1963 with a Masters in Mechanical Engineering. He finished his formal education after receiving an MBA at Northwestern University.

== Career ==
Linquist founded Metro PCS as General Wireless, Inc. in 1994. The company was later acquired by T-Mobile US.

Before his death, Linquist served as CEO and Managing Partner of NXGen Partners, a private equity company based in Dallas.

== Awards ==
- 2011: Entrepreneur of the Year award by Inc. in the category media.

== Personal life ==
Linquist died of cancer in 2015. He was married to Sue (Sandel) Linquist. Together they had four children, two sons and two daughters.
