= John J. Uicker =

American engineering professor (1938–2023)

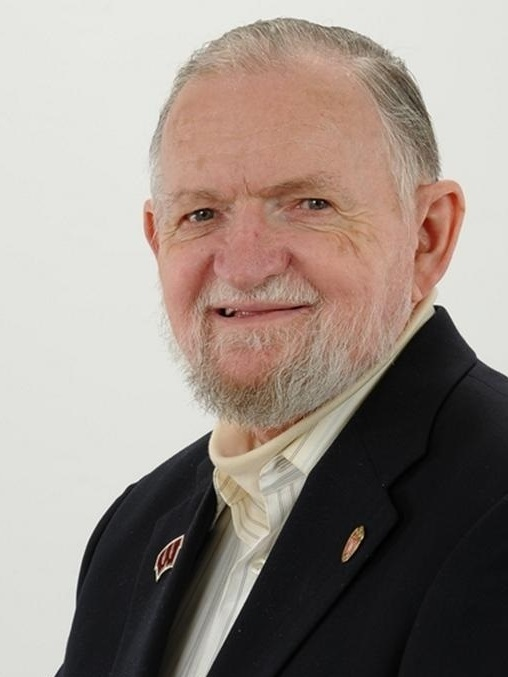
- John J. Uicker, Jr. 2013
- Born: John J. Uicker, Jr. July 11, 1938; East Derry, New Hampshire, U.S.
- Died: April 25, 2023 (aged 84); Madison, Wisconsin, U.S.
- Education: University of Detroit and Northwestern University
- Known for: 4 X 4 Matrix Method Mechanism analysis • Sheth-Uicker Notation for mechanism
- Scientific career
- Fields: Engineering, Kinematics and Kinetics
- Workplaces: University of Wisconsin-Madison
- Doctoral advisor: Jacques Denavit

John J. Uicker, Jr (July 11, 1938 – April 25, 2023) was an American professor of mechanical engineering at the University of Wisconsin-Madison, Wisconsin from 1967 to 2007 and professor emeritus from 2007 until his death in 2023.

== Education ==
Uicker received his BME degree from the University of Detroit, and his MS and PhD degrees in mechanical engineering from Northwestern University. During his education, Uicker joined the engineering honor societies Pi Tau Sigma and Sigma Xi. He developed the (4x4) matrix method for kinematic analysis as part of his doctoral research. Following his education, Uicker served two years in the US Army Metrology and Calibration Center at the Frankford Arsenal in Philadelphia, PA. He received a certificate of commendation from the Army for his historically significant paper on "Dynamic Force Analysis of Spatial Linkages."

He joined the University of Wisconsin faculty in 1967, where he served until his retirement in 2007. In this role, he became the pioneering researcher on transformation matrix methods of linkage analysis, and was the first to advise on their use in the dynamics of mechanical systems. In 1969, he was awarded the Ralph R Teetor Educational Fund Award of the Society of Automotive Engineers at Detroit, MI. As an ASEE resident fellow, Uicker spent 1972–73 at Ford Motor Company. He was also awarded a Fulbright-Hayes Senior Lectureship and became a visiting professor at Cranfield Institute of Technology in Cranfield, England, in 1978–79.

== Career ==
Throughout his career, his teaching and research focused on solid geometric modeling and the modeling of mechanical motion, and their application to computer-aided design and manufacturing, including kinematics, dynamics, and simulation of articulated rigid-body mechanical systems. He advised numerous masters and doctoral students during his tenure at the UW and was twice awarded for distinguished teaching.

Uicker coined the 4 X 4 matrix method for kinematic analysis of linkages in 1964. This provided, for the first time, a numerical method for the position solution of spatial linkages. He proposed the Sheth-Uicker Notation for kinematic analysis of mechanical linkages in 1971 which remedied ambiguities in the Denavit-Hartenberg notation method.

Involvement in professional associations was important to Uicker's growth and recognition in his field. He served on several national committees of The American Society of Mechanical Engineers (ASME] and the Society of Automotive Engineers (SAE). He received the ASME Mechanisms Committee Award in 2004 and was named ASME Fellow in 2007. He is a founding member of the U.S. Council on the Theory of Mechanism and Machine Science and of the International Federation of Mechanism and Machine Science (IFToMM). He served as editor-in-chief of the Mechanism and Machine Theory journal of the federation from 1973 to 1978. He was a registered mechanical engineer in Wisconsin for over 50 years and served for many years as an active consultant to industry. Uicker was a fellow of the American Society of Mechanical Engineers and was awarded the Mechanisms and Robotics Committee Award for his many years of service on the committee. He also served on the Computational Geometry Committee and the Design Automation Committee.

Uicker was instrumental in initiating a new era of computing for education on the University of Wisconsin-Madison campus. He founded their Computer Aided Engineering Center and served as director for its initial ten years of operation. Using these facilities, Uicker and his students developed a number of geometric modeling and computer-aided design techniques for the simulation of solidification in metal castings, which made manufacturing more predictable and cost-effective. With funding from the National Science Foundation and contributions from the UW and Ford Motor Company, Uicker's research program developed a computer software system called the Integrated Mechanisms Program (IMP). This was the first generalized software system for the kinematic, static, and dynamic simulation of rigid body mechanical systems such as robots and automotive suspensions. His solid modeling software system was known as Geometric Modeling of Solids (GMOS). These concepts were extended to the analysis of solidification in metal castings with a software application known as SWIFT. All of these programs supported industry automation and were utilized by hundreds of companies across the US and even around the world.

Uicker died on April 25, 2023, at the age 84.

== Works ==
- John J. Uicker, Bahram Ravani, Pradip N. Sheth. Matrix Methods in Design Analysis of Mechanisms and Multi-body Systems. Cambridge University Press, 2013.
- John Joseph Uicker, G. R. Pennock, Joseph Edward Shigley. Theory of Machines and Mechanisms. 5th ed. New York: Oxford University Press, 2017.
