= Sonnia Agu =

Nigerian entrepreneur

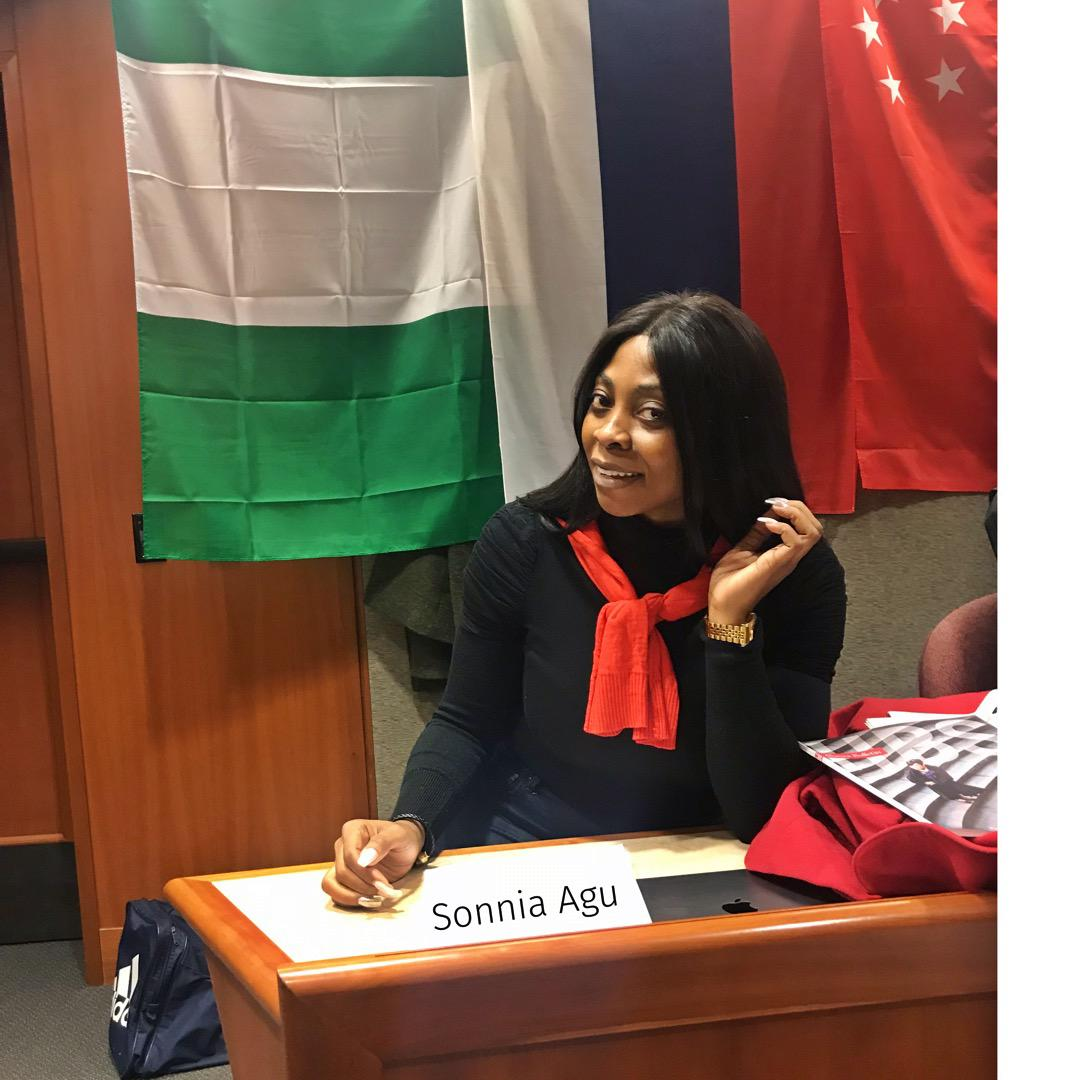
- Born: September 15, 1988 (age 38); Lagos state
- Education: Eastern Mediterranean University Cyprus
- Occupation: Social entrepreneur
- Notable work: The founder and CEO of The Sapio Club and G1st International Foundation
- Website: https://sonniaagu.com/

Sonnia Agu (born 15 September 1988) is a Nigerian social entrepreneur. She is the founder and CEO of The Sapio Club and G1st International Foundation. She is an executive board member of the Nigerian chapter of the Pan African Youth Commission. In 2020, she was listed by Lagos state youth parliament as one of Lagos state's most influential young persons in 2020.

== Early life and education ==
Sonnia Agu was born in Lagos State, Nigeria and is originally from Okija in Anambra state. She began her education at Christland Nursery and Primary School Ikeja. For her secondary education, she attended the Federal Government Girls College in Oyo State. She started studying creative arts at the University of Lagos but left in her third year to Eastern Mediterranean University, Cyprus where she graduated with a first-class degree in Media and Communications.

Post COVID-19, she got another educational achievement from MIT (Massachusetts institute of Technology) in Business and impact planning for social enterprises.

In 2019, she enrolled at the Harvard Business School where she was certified with a passing grade as an Entrepreneur from an Emerging Economy. She also received a passing grade from OxfordX an initiative of Oxford University in Understanding Economic Development.

== Career ==
In 2013, after returning to Nigeria from University in Cyprus, Agu founded the G1st International Foundation, a nonprofit organization. G1st is short for "God First". G1st has collaborated internationally with Growth Foundation, London; SOS Foundation, Gambia; Lawrence Hope Foundation, South Africa and Food for Life, Hungary. In 2015, the Civic Engagement arm of the G1st Foundation was founded, tagged the Sapiosexual Club, which is registered with the Nigerian Federal Ministry of Trade and Investment.

In 2013, Agu worked under the office of the Special Adviser to the President on Ethics and Morals, Sarah Jibril where she co-founded the initiative Youths on Ethics and Social Responsibility (YES). In February 2014, she was part of the team that hosted Nigeria's Centenary celebration, A Nation United, which was hosted by President Goodluck Ebele Jonathan. In 2016, she received the Lagos State Award of Excellence for her contribution to the growth and development of education in the Ajegunle.

Agu received the 2018 West African Leadership Summit Award for Community Development in recognition of her "exemplary leadership, selfless service, and dedication to the socio-economic development of West Africa". In June 2018, she participated in the round table discussion "Not Another Nigerian Idea", a project geared towards countering violent extremism hosted by NERI (North East Regional Initiative).

Agu represented Nigeria in Gambia, at the African Youth Commission's 3rd Pan African Conference hosted by the United Nations Population Fund (UNFPA), to analyze and brainstorm on methodologies for the achievement of the United Nations' 2063 United Africa Goal in 2019. In December 2019, Agu represented Nigeria at the World Youth Forum, held in Cairo, Egypt, where she was selected by Egyptian president Abdelfattah El-Sisi as an African Women Ambassador.

In April 2022, she was given an award as "an Achiever per Excellence" by the National Association of Northern Nigerian Students. On November 22, 2023, she was given a certificate for Award for Global Excellence by Leadership Without Borders at The House of Lords Palace of Westminster London, UK.

== Awards and honours ==
In 2025, Agu was named in the "Top 40 Under 40" by Most Influential People of African Descent (MIPAD) for her Activism & Humanitarianism. Same 2025, Crest Africa honored her as one of Africa's Leading Women.

- Award for Global Excellence, House of Lords, Westminster Palace (UK), 2023
- Outstanding African Social Entrepreneur, African Achievers' Awards (UK), 2023
- Achiever per Excellence," National Association of Northern Nigerian Students, 2022
- Lagos State's Most Influential Young Persons (Lagos Youth Parliament) award 2020
- African Women Ambassador 2019
- West African Leadership Summit Award (Community Development) 2018
