= Hripsime Stambulyan =

Armenian politician (born 1983)

Member of National Assembly
- In office 1 August 2021 – 6 December 2022

Personal details
- Born: 1 January 1983 (age 43) Ararat, Armenian SSR, Soviet Union
- Party: Reborn Armenia
- Education: Yerevan Brusov State University of Languages and Social Sciences; Eastern Mediterranean University

Hripsime Stambulyan (Armenian: Հռիփսիﬔ Ստամբուլյան; born 1 January 1983) is an Armenian politician. She had served as a member of the National Assembly from 2021 to 2022.

== Early life and education ==
Stambulyan was born on 1 January 1983 in Ararat, Armenia. In 2007, she graduated from the Yerevan Brusov State University of Languages and Social Sciences through the separate Faculty of Linguistics as well as Political Sciences, and the following later, she graduated from the Eastern Mediterranean University through its Faculty of Management.

== Political career ==
In the 2021 parliamentary election, Stambulyan was elected to the National Assembly as a member of the political party Reborn Armenia, as part of the Armenia Alliance electoral list. On 29 November 2022, she was one of the Reborn Armenia members of parliament who decided to terminate their positions in the National Assembly.

== Personal life ==
Stambulyan is married and has two children.
