= British Cypriots =

Community in the United Kingdom

British Cypriots (Cypriots in the United Kingdom)
Total population
- UK residents born in Cyprus (2011 Census); England: 78,795; Wales: 1,215; Scotland: 1,941; Northern Ireland: 344

Regions with significant populations
- London, Liverpool, Birmingham, Manchester, Glasgow, Bristol

Languages
- English, Greek, Turkish

Religion
- Majority; Christianity; Minority; Islam

The British Cypriot community in the United Kingdom consists of British people born on, or with ancestors from, the Eastern Mediterranean island of Cyprus. British Cypriot people may be of Greek, Turkish, Maronite, or Armenian descent.

Migration from Cyprus to the UK has occurred in part due to the colonial links between the countries and the internal conflict that followed Cyprus' independence from the British Empire in 1960. Migration peaked at the time of independence but has continued on a smaller scale. The number of Cypriot-born people in the UK fell between the 1991 and 2001 censuses, but the community, including people of Cypriot ancestry, remains sizeable, and the Cypriot-born population grew slightly between the 2001 and 2011 censuses.

A number of famous British people are of Cypriot ancestry, including musicians George Michael, Cat Stevens and B Young, footballer Leon Osman, comedians Jamie Demetriou and Natasia Demetriou, visual artist Tracey Emin, and politician Lord Adonis.

== History ==
Before the First World War, very few Cypriots migrated to the UK and the British Cypriot population at this time was around 150, according to historian Stavros Panteli. Only a handful of marriages involving Cypriots are recorded at London's Greek Orthodox Cathedral of Saint Sophia in the years before 1918. During the First World War many Cypriots joined the allied forces. When the British annexed Cyprus in 1914, Cypriots' political status changed and they found it easier to travel.

The 1931 British Census recorded more than 1,000 Cypriot-born people, but many of these were the children of British military personnel serving in the Mediterranean. However, some Greek Cypriots did migrate to the UK in the 1920s and 1930s, often finding jobs in the catering industry in Soho. By the start of the Second World War, there were around 8,000 Cypriots in London. More Cypriot immigrants arrived during the National Organisation of Cypriot Fighters (EOKA)'s campaign for Cypriot independence from Britain and union with Greece, which started in 1955. In the four years of conflict, an average of 4,000 Cypriots left the island per year for the UK, because of violence on the island and the fear felt by both Greek and Turkish Cypriots in mixed villages where they formed minorities. Migration peaked following independence in 1960, with around 25,000 Cypriots migrating in the year that followed. Many migrants joined family already living in Britain. Further migration accompanied the Turkish invasion of the island in 1974. Home Office figures show that roughly 10,000 Cypriots fled to the UK, the majority of them refugees, but many of them subsequently returned to the island.

In the 1960s, Greek Cypriots in London outnumbered Turkish Cypriots by four to one. The increase in post-war rents in central London had forced many Cypriot immigrants to move north within the city. The Greek and Turkish Cypriot communities tended to be geographically segregated, with Greeks settling mainly in Camden and Turks in Stoke Newington. This was due to the migrants' reliance on social networks to find housing on their arrival. Robert Winder reports that "Haringey became the second biggest Cypriot town in the world". Many Cypriots set up restaurants, filling a gap left by Italians, many of whom had been interned during the Second World War.

Much of the Turkish Cypriot migration to the UK occurred as a consequence of intercommunal violence in Cyprus during the 1950s and 1960s. Many Turkish Cypriots viewed the EOKA insurgency as an attempt on the part of Greek Cypriots to establish hegemony on the island with the aim of achieving union with Greece. By 1958, there were around 8,500 Turkish Cypriots in Britain. Between 1960 and 1962, the inflow increased substantially because of a fear that Britain would impose immigration controls, and indeed the Commonwealth Immigrants Act 1962 did reduce migration flows from Cyprus to Britain. Although the expansion of Britain's Turkish Cypriot community took place primarily between the late 1940s and the mid-1960s, there was a further influx of around 3,000 immigrants after partition in 1974. Migration continued because of the political and economic situation in the 1970s and 1980s, and Turkish Cypriots have continued to migrate to the UK due to high unemployment rates in northern Cyprus. In the early 1980s, it was estimated that 160,000 Cypriots were resident in the UK, 20 to 25 per cent of them being Turkish Cypriots. After Cyprus joined the European Union in May 2004, holders of Republic of Cyprus passports were able to migrate freely to the UK under EU law until Brexit.

According to the BBC, while divisions and resentment exist between Greek and Turkish Cypriots in the UK, particularly amongst those old enough to remember atrocities committed in Cyprus, "if differences of opinion exist, both sides have learnt to live together regardless". Community relations are generally good, with Turkish Cypriot community centres welcoming Greek Cypriots and vice versa. In oral history interviews conducted by academic Nergis Canefe in the late 1990s, Turkish Cypriots in London tended to define themselves as Anglo-Cypriot, particularly if they were born in the UK. Canefe notes that her interviewees were proud to be Cypriot, but also of being British and not Turkish. They had Turkish friends, but also close Greek and Greek Cypriot friends. The neighbourhoods they inhabited tended to be ethnically mixed, and often shared with Greeks and Greek Cypriots.

== Demographics ==
=== Population ===
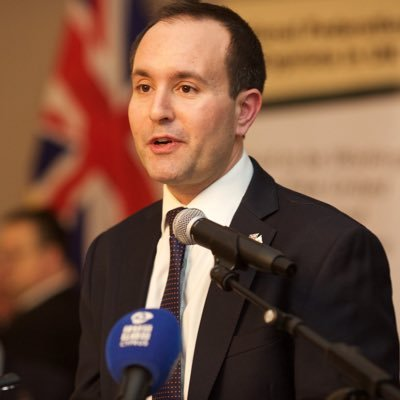
Christos Karaolis, President of the National Federation of Cypriots in the UK.

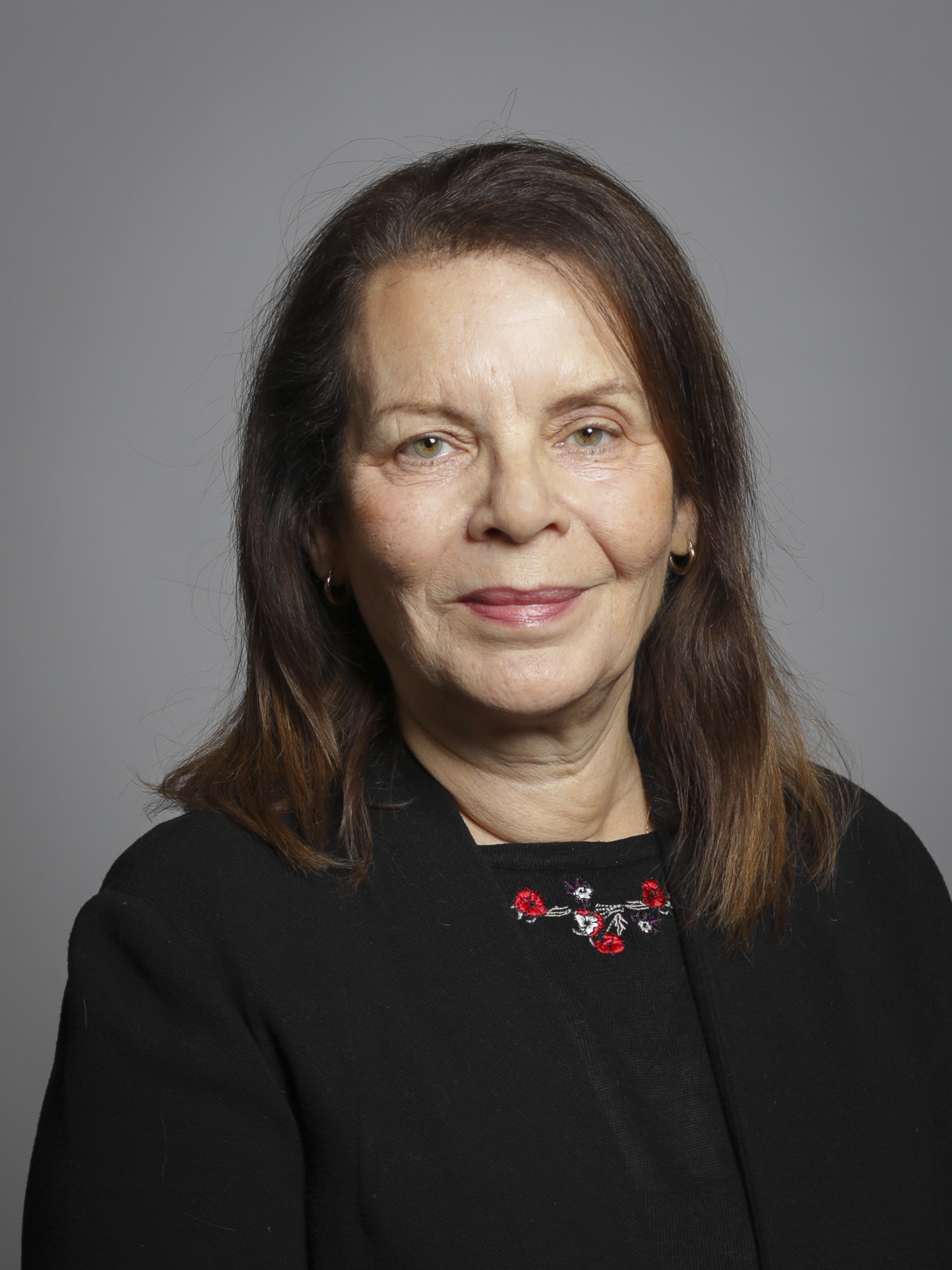
Baroness Hussein-Ece, member of the House of Lords.

Cyprus appeared amongst the top ten non-British countries of birth for the first time in the 1961 Census, which recorded 42,000 Cypriot-born people living in England and Wales. This number peaked in the 1981 Census, at 83,000. The 2001 Census recorded 77,673 Cypriot-born people residing in the whole of the UK. The number of Cypriot-born people in Great Britain fell from 78,191 in 1991 to 77,156 in 2001, one of the few country-of-birth groups to experience a decrease in numbers. According to the 2011 UK Census, there were 78,795 Cypriot-born residents in England, 1,215 in Wales, 1,941 in Scotland, and 344 in Northern Ireland. More recent estimates by the Office for National Statistics put the number of Cypriot-born residents in the UK as a whole at 60,000 in 2015.

British Cypriot people include those of Greek-, Turkish-, Maronite-, or Armenian-Cypriot descent. The National Federation of Cypriots in the UK, an umbrella organisation representing the Cypriot community associations and groups across the UK with largely Greek Cypriot memberships, claims to represent more than 300,000 people of Cypriot ancestry. A similar figure was given by then Minister for Europe Caroline Flint, who, giving a speech at the London School of Economics in February 2009, stated that more than 300,000 Greek and Turkish Cypriots were living in the UK. This figure was repeated by the then Minister for Europe, Leo Docherty, at the Celebration of Cyprus Gala Dinner in January 2023, organised by the National Federation of Cypriots in the UK.

Estimates on the Turkish Cypriot population vary according to figures on the Turkish Cypriot-born population and that of estimates which include UK-born descendants. A 1993 report by the Council of Europe said that 100,000 Turkish Cypriots had settled in England (i.e. excluding descendants). The Turkish consulate in London has said that 130,000 TRNC nationals were living in the UK; this was reiterated in a 2009 report by the Department for Communities and Local Government which said that this is not a "true indication" of the population because it "excludes British born and dual heritage children". More recently, evidence submitted by the Home Office to the House of Commons Home Affairs Select Committee in February 2011 suggested that there were about 300,000 people of Turkish Cypriot origin living in the UK. The estimate of 300,000 people of Turkish Cypriot origin has also been suggested by Professor Levent Vahdettin et al. in 2016, Professor Michael Freeman et al. in 2021, as well as reports published by the BBC (2011) and The Enfield Independent (2018). In a 2020 report published by the TRNC Public Information Office, Ersin Tatar said that there was now more than 300,000 Turkish Cypriots in the UK. A 2011 report by Kıbrıs had already suggested that there could be 400,000 Turkish Cypriots in the UK. More recently, in 2019, Arthur Scott-Geddes of The National said that "as many as 400,000 Turkish Cypriots" were "concentrated in the areas of north and north-east London including Hackney, Enfield and Haringey". The Anadolu Agency also said 400,000 Turkish Cypriots were living in London.

Of the 80,010 people in England and Wales who specified their country of birth as Cyprus in the 2011 Census, 57.5 per cent stated that they were Christian, 20.8 per cent that they were Muslim, 13.1 per cent responded that they had no religion, and 7.9 per cent did not state a religion. Small numbers of Buddhists, Hindus, Jews, Sikhs and those of other religions were recorded, totaling 0.6 per cent of the Cypriot-born resident population.

=== Population distribution ===
Of the 80,010 Cypriot-born residents of England and Wales recorded by the 2011 Census, 43,428 were in London and 8,254 in South East England. Detailed analysis of data from the previous census shows that of the 77,156 Cypriot-born people living in mainland Britain, 60 per cent lived in areas of London with Turkish communities. A total of 45,887 were resident in Greater London. Analysis of the census shows that Cypriot-born people were found in large numbers in the London boroughs of Enfield, Haringey, Barnet and Hackney. The census tracts with the highest number of Cypriot-born people were Southgate, Palmers Green, Upper Edmonton, Cockfosters, Lower Edmonton, Tottenham North and Tottenham South. Outside of London, concentrations are found in Borehamwood, Cheshunt, and Bristol.

== Notable individuals ==
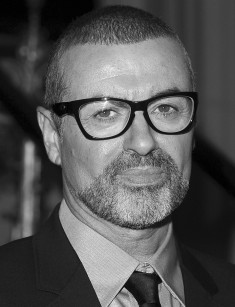
George Michael

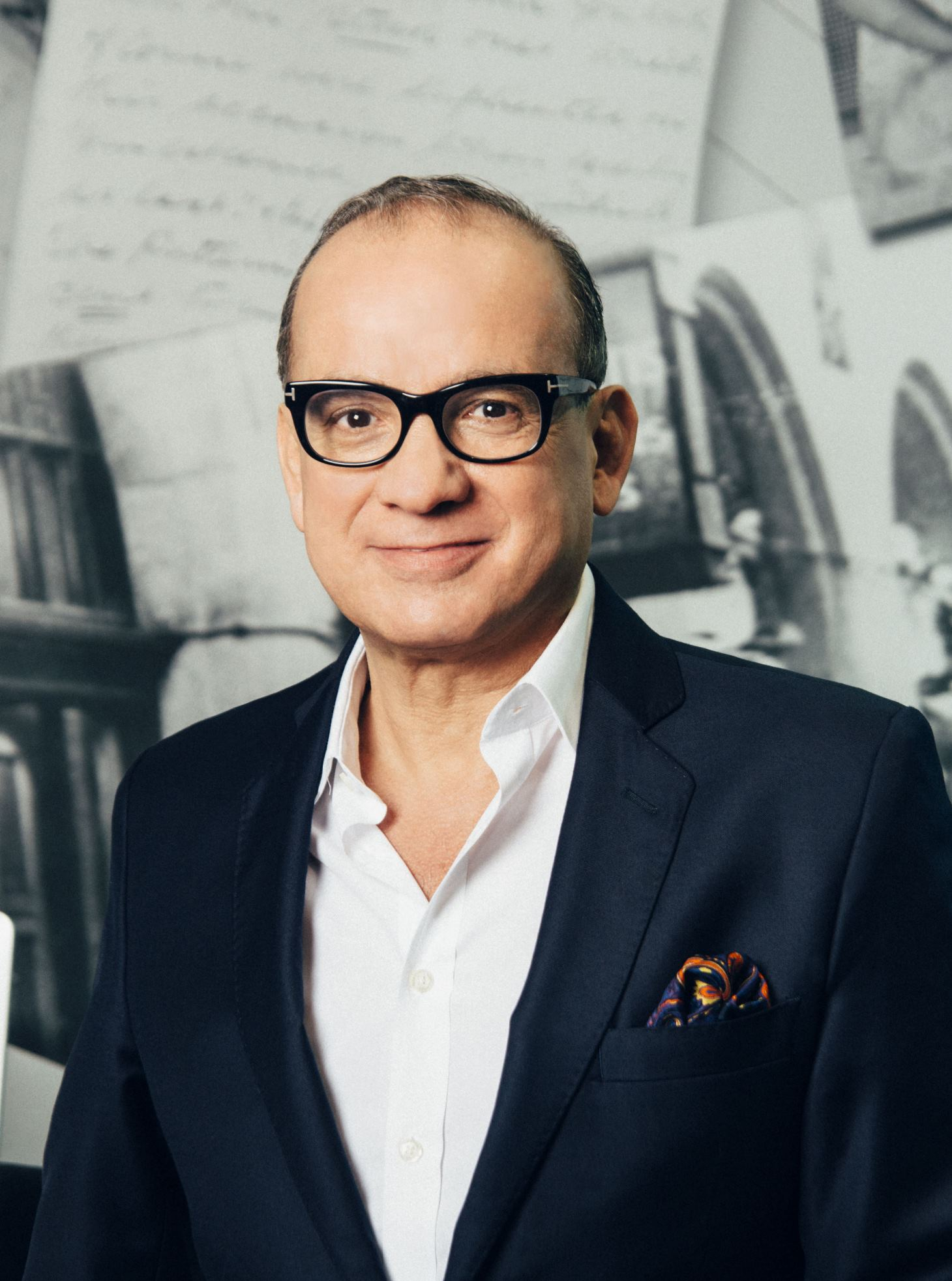
Touker Suleyman

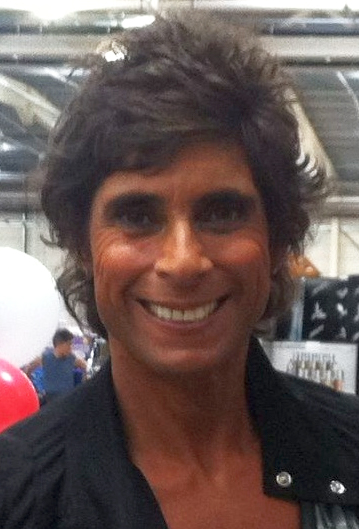
Fatima Whitbread

A number of British Cypriot people are well known in the UK and overseas.

In the Greek Cypriot community, these include George Michael, who was born in London to a Greek Cypriot father; Cat Stevens, who was also born in London to a Greek Cypriot father; entrepreneur Stelios Haji-Ioannou; Andreas Liveras, a Greek Cypriot-born businessman killed in the 2008 Mumbai attacks; Theo Paphitis, an entrepreneur and TV personality; Greek Cypriot-born artist Panayiotis Kalorkoti; Politician Andrew Adonis's father is a Greek Cypriot who moved to the UK aged 18, and both of Labour MP Bambos Charalambous's parents were born in Cyprus.

Many Turkish Cypriots have also contributed to the arts, literature, music, sciences, sports and politics in the UK. Mustafa Djamgoz is Professor of Cancer Biology at Imperial College London and Chairman of the College of Medicine’s Science Council; Tracey Emin, CBE, (Turkish Cypriot father) is an artist and a Royal Academician of the Royal Academy of Arts; Touker Suleyman is a fashion retail entrepreneur and a "dragon" on Dragon's Den; Hussein Chalayan, MBE, is the winner of the British Designer of the Year in 1999 and 2000; Selin Kiazim is a celebrity chef and winner of the Great British Menu; Ramadan Güney was the founder of the first Turkish mosque in the UK (Shacklewell Lane Mosque) and former owner of the UK's largest cemetery Brookwood Cemetery; Richard Hickmet was the first British-Turkish Cypriot politician who was a Conservative MP in 1983–87; Meral Hussein-Ece, OBE, is the first Turkish Cypriot member of the House of Lords; Alp Mehmet, MVO, was the first of two foreign-born politicians to be appointed ambassador by the UK, having served in Iceland in 2004; and Emma Edhem is a lawyer and councilwoman of the City of London Corporation. In music, notable performers include Erol Alkan; Işın Karaca (Turkish Cypriot mother) Ziynet Sali and B Young. Notable sportspeople include Paralympic swimmer Dervis Konuralp (Turkish Cypriot father); boxing trainer Adam Booth (Turkish Cypriot father); snooker player Michael Georgiou; and numerous football players, including Muzzy Izzet and Colin Kazim-Richards who have played for the Turkey national football team; Billy Mehmet who plays for the Turkish Cypriot national football team; and Rhian Brewster (Turkish Cypriot mother).

British athlete and former world javelin champion Fatima Whitbread was born in London to a Turkish Cypriot mother and Greek Cypriot father, though she was later adopted.

== See also ==
- Cyprus–United Kingdom relations
- Greek Cypriot diaspora
- Greeks in the United Kingdom
- Turkish Cypriot diaspora
- Turks in the United Kingdom
- British Overseas citizen#Cyprus
