= Abdul Kerim al-Qubrusi =

Representative of the Naqshbandi-Nazimiyya Sufi Order in the USA

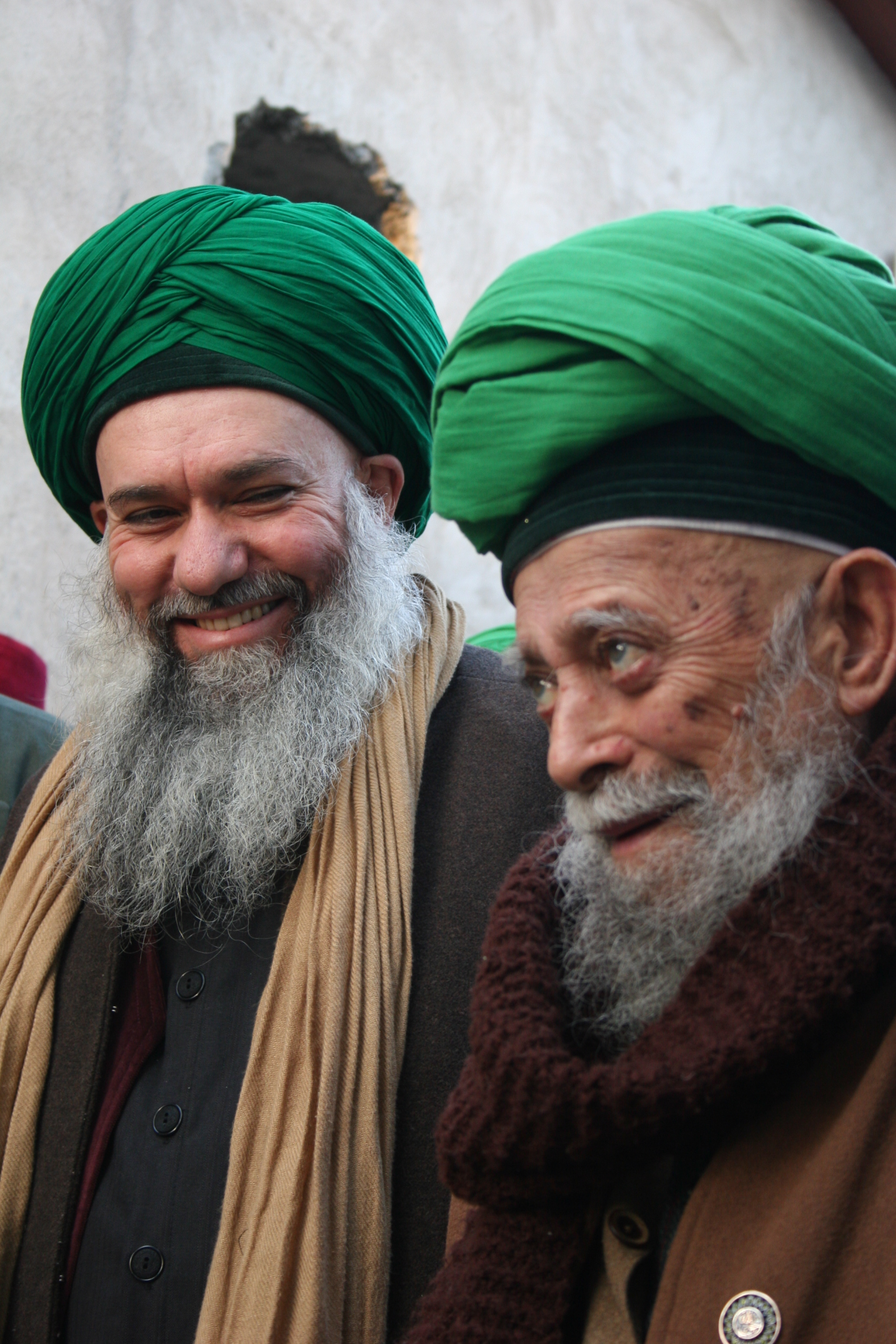
- Born: Aydoğan Fuat; 11 November 1957; Polis, Cyprus
- Died: 30 June 2012 (aged 54); Lefke, TRNC
- Occupation: A former representative of the Naqshbandi-Haqqani Sufi Order in the USA
- Website: naqshbandi.org

Aydoğan Fuat, formally referred to as Shaykh Abdul Kerim al-Qubrusi (Turkish: Şeyh Abdülkerim Kıbrısî), was an American Sufi Sheikh of Turkish Cypriot origin and former representative of the Naqshbandi-Haqqani Order in the United States, under the lead of Nazim Al-Haqqani.

== Early years ==
Abdülkerim was born to Fuat (later Fuat Savaşkan), a dervish known in tariqat circles as Hajji Fuad ar-Rabbani. He attended the khutbah by Shaykh Nazim at Lala Mustafa Pasha Mosque in Famagusta and later became a disciple. In November 1973, he joined the Turkish Resistance Organisation and fought around Varosha, Famagusta during the Turkish invasion of Cyprus in 1974.

Through his life he served under Shaykh Nazim, becoming his representative in North America and throughout the world.

== In the United States ==
In 1974, Shaykh Nazim commissioned Abdülkerim to found a Naqshbandi-Haqqani branch in the United States. He undertook charity work in New York City, mostly rehabilitation of drug addicts.

In 2002, he founded the Osmanlı Dergâhı, a zawiya located in Catskill Mountains, New York. Shaykh Abdul Kerim converted a barn to a Sufi Dergah in the Ottoman tradition. Prayers are held five times a day with special services on Fridays. The Sufi center concentrates on Sufi Zikr (remembrance) with ceremonies every Thursday night and provides outreach to the surrounding community of Sidney, New York. In the words of Mawlana Shaykh Nazim Adil al-Haqqani, "He stood up against unbelief. Only one man, and in the US also, another center of unbelief. He also taught them their lesson and limits!"

== Death ==
Abdülkerim died of heart attack during a visit to his dargah in Lefka. He is interred at the Ottoman Cemetery in Famagusta, Northern Cyprus.
