= Metro by T-Mobile =

American telecommunications company

- Formerly: General Wireless, Inc.; MetroPCS Communications, Inc.
- Type: Division
- Traded as: NYSE: PCS (2007-2012)
- Industry: Wireless telecommunications
- Founded: 1994; 32 years ago
- Founders: Malcolm Lorang; Roger Linquist
- Headquarters: Richardson, Texas, United States
- Area served: United States
- Key people: Thomas C. Keys (president); Maria Yniga Inaque Ynez B. Zobel De Ayala
- Services: Mobile communications
- Parent: T-Mobile US (2012-present)
- Website: metrobyt-mobile.com

Metro by T-Mobile, formerly known as MetroPCS, is an American prepaid wireless service provider and brand owned by T-Mobile US. It previously operated the fifth largest mobile telecommunications network in the United States using code-division multiple access (CDMA). In 2013, the carrier engaged in a reverse merger with T-Mobile US; post-merger, its services were merged under T-Mobile's UMTS and LTE network. Metro by T-Mobile had twenty million subscribers as of 2021.

== History ==
=== Early history ===
Metro was established in 1994 as General Wireless, Inc., by Roger Linquist and Malcolm Lorang. PCS referred to the industry term, Personal Communications Service. Its service was first launched in 2002.

As of February 2005, MetroPCS had about 1.5 million subscribers in the country. At the time, the company operated through 21 licenses in Greater Miami, Tampa, Sarasota, New York City, San Francisco, Atlanta and Sacramento. The company expanded to the Dallas and Detroit areas later that year.

On April 19, 2007, MetroPCS made its stock market debut. Its 50 million share IPO closed at $27.40, for a market cap of $8 billion.

=== Merger with T-Mobile ===
In February 2012, Sprint Nextel Corporation pursued a plan to buy MetroPCS, though the plan was rejected by Sprint's board of directors shortly before it was due to be announced.

In October 2012, MetroPCS reached an agreement to merge with T-Mobile USA. Shortly after the announcement, Sprint was reported to be considering a rival bid. A reverse merger for MetroPCS, the deal closed on May 1, 2013. The combined company, now known as T-Mobile US, began trading on the New York Stock Exchange. On June 21, 2015, the legacy MetroPCS CDMA network was decommissioned, and customers were migrated to the company's LTE network.

At the time of the merger, T-Mobile had about 32 million subscribers, to which MetroPCS added around 9 million.

In 2012, there was a series of armed robberies in Metro stores which was attributed to low security measures.

In the same year, T-Mobile and Metro became some of the earliest companies to offer unlimited data plans.

=== Rebranding ===
MetroPCS logo from January 2002, until its rebrand in 2018.

On September 24, 2018, T-Mobile announced that it would relaunch the brand as Metro by T-Mobile (a move that would take effect two weeks later), introducing new unlimited plans offering bundled features such as Amazon Prime subscriptions and Google One storage, and announcing that the brand aimed to be the first prepaid mobile carrier to offer 5G in 2019. T-Mobile stated that these changes would help to reduce the negative stigmas associated with MetroPCS's prepaid services, by aligning them with other well-known brands as value-added services, and placing a larger emphasis on its use of T-Mobile's network. The renamed carrier launched in early October 2018. At the time of the name change, T-Mobile's subscriber number had increased to around 75 million and Metro's had doubled to around 18 million users and had increased their nationwide market reach from around 12 to 100 markets.

== Corporate affairs ==
=== Products ===
Metro is T-Mobile US's branch of prepaid services, currently offering a large variety of smartphones and four data plans as of March 18, 2019.

=== Advertising ===
In February 2019, the company announced a new long-term advertising campaign featuring Milwaukee Bucks player Giannis Antetokounmpo.

== Criticism ==
=== Network quality ===
In November 2010, Kevin Tofel noted that although the LTE network was based on 4G technology, the infrastructure MetroPCS is using keeps speeds in the range of older 3G networks. Tofel measured data speeds far slower than T-Mobile's HSPA+ network but considered that users with only basic data requirements would find the no-contract deal refreshing. Referencing Tofel's review, Corvida Raven of Laptop Mag concluded that MetroPCS "probably isn't using the best LTE technology."

In February 2011, Farhad Manjoo of Slate panned the service by suggesting that MetroPCS was able to roll out 4G coverage sooner and cheaper than its competitors by offering only the Samsung Craft, a feature phone with sub-standard internet capabilities, as its launch device. Due to the quality of the device (described as being "designed not just to frustrate users but to get us to swear off ever using any phone again"), the network, and MetroPCS's decision to block video streaming services aside from YouTube under its "unlimited web" plan, Manjoo considered it a device designed to disappoint users excited for 4G.

However, in a 2019 study by J.D. Power, Metro by T-Mobile ranked highest among non-contract full-service carriers.

=== Marketing ===
MetroPCS attracted criticism in 2010 for an advertising campaign featuring two Indian characters, Ranjit and Chad (the former being played by veteran Indian actor Anjul Nigam), hosting a phone-in show titled Tech & Talk. Their content was believed to be stereotypical and offensive.

Following the T-Mobile merger, MetroPCS introduced a campaign to highlight its inclusion of all related taxes and fees in advertised prices. The campaign was ridiculed by many people who interpreted an unintended double meaning in the slogan "Period Power", referring to the menstrual cycle.

=== Cybersecurity incidents ===
In November 2015, a MetroPCS payment system vulnerability was identified by security researchers Eric Taylor and Blake Welsh. The flaw in the company’s online payment portal allowed anyone with knowledge of a customer’s phone number to view sensitive account details, including the subscriber’s home address, phone model and serial number, and billing plan. The issue was reported responsibly to MetroPCS and was subsequently patched.

In August 2021, Metro by T-Mobile disclosed that customer information had been compromised as part of a wider cyberattack on T-Mobile. The company reported that data from up to 52,000 current Metro by T-Mobile accounts was exposed. According to T-Mobile, no personally identifiable information such as Social Security numbers or financial details was involved, and the breach did not affect former Sprint Corporation Prepaid or Boost Mobile customers.

== Awards ==
Metro ranked first in customer experience among the non-contract full-service carriers in the 2018 and 2019 J.D. Power U.S. Wireless Purchase Experience Non-Contract Performance Studies.

== See also ==
- List of mobile network operators of the Americas
