= Eastern Mediterranean University =

Public university in Cyprus

Coordinates: 35.145716°N 33.907079°E

- Doğu Akdeniz Üniversitesi
- Motto: "Virtue, Knowledge, Advancement"
- Type: Public
- Established: 1979; 47 years ago
- Rector: Hasan Kılıç
- Students: 18,000
- Location: Famagusta, (Turkish: Gazimağusa), Northern Cyprus
- Campus: Urban
- Language: English, Turkish
- Website: www.emu.edu.tr

The Eastern Mediterranean University (EMU; Turkish: Doğu Akdeniz Üniversitesi) is a public university in Northern Cyprus, was established in 1979, led by Onay Fadıl Demirciler, who was then the undersecretary of the Ministry of Education. Initially founded as a technology-focused higher-education institution for Turkish Cypriots, it was granted state university status in 1986. The university's campus is situated within the city of Famagusta.

The university boasts 141 programs across 12 Faculties and 4 Schools, offering a range of undergraduate and postgraduate degrees, supported by substantial research infrastructure. Instruction is provided in both Turkish and English, with an English Preparatory School available to help students enhance their English proficiency.

University rankings
- Eastern Mediterranean University

Global – Overall
- QS World: =691 (2026)
- THE World: 501–600 (2023)
- USNWR Global: 782 (2023)

Regional – Overall
- QS Emerging Europe and Central Asia: 175 (2022)

== Campus ==
=== Faculties and schools ===
The university has 13 Faculties and 5 Schools. The Faculties are as follows, in order of their establishment:

- Faculty of Arts & Sciences (inaugurated 1986)
- Faculty of Business & Economics (inaugurated 1986)
- Faculty of Engineering (inaugurated 1986)
- Faculty of Architecture (inaugurated 1990)
- Faculty of Law (inaugurated 1996)
- Faculty of Communication & Media Studies (inaugurated 1997)
- Faculty of Education (inaugurated 1999)
- Faculty of Health Sciences (inaugurated 2010)
- Faculty of Pharmacy (inaugurated 2011)
- Faculty of Medicine (inaugurated 2012)
- Faculty of Tourism (inaugurated 2012)
- Faculty of Dentistry (inaugurated 2019)
- Faculty of Computer & Information Sciences (inaugurated 2025)

The Schools are as follows:

- School of Computing & Technology (inaugurated 1986)
- School of Tourism & Hospitality Management (inaugurated 1990)
- School of Justice (inaugurated 2010)
- School of Health Services (inaugurated 2012)
- School of Information Technologies (restructured 2025)

=== Library ===
Library's main entrance. The building was finished in 1994.

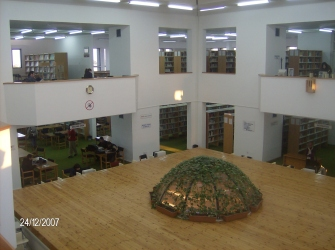
Inside View from the 3rd Floor of the Library

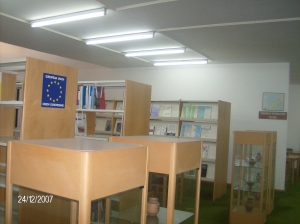
EMU Library's European Union Corner

A pathway from the library towards central campus

=== Sports ===
The campus boasts a variety of sports facilities, including tennis and basketball courts, AstroTurf football pitches, and an outdoor athletics stadium. Additionally, the Lala Mustafa Pasha indoor sports center, another key facility on campus, hosts major sporting and cultural events.

=== Social activities ===
Eastern Mediterranean University owns a radio station on 106.5 FM called Radio EMU broadcasting to the whole island.

== International outreach ==
Mechanical Engineering, one of the oldest buildings in the campus

Eastern Mediterranean University is a full member of several international associations of universities, including the European University Association, the Caucasus University Association, and the International Association of Universities. It has gained accreditation for Turkish students from the Council of Higher Education and the Turkish Cypriot higher education organization, while maintaining its independent status through its non-profit foundation.

Eastern Mediterranean University has ranked in the top 50 universities of the world in the Times Higher Education International Student Table, reaching 4th place in the world in 2024 with 74.8% international students. It also boasts international faculty members from countries including the UK, Russia, Hungary, Iran, and Pakistan. 16 Scientists across the Eastern Mediterranean University feature in Stanford/Elsevier's latest Top 2% Scientist Rankings.

== Accreditations ==
At least 55 programs at Eastern Mediterranean University and the associated English preparatory school have received accreditations, from 13 different international bodies. These include:

- ABET accreditation of several bachelor's programs at the Faculty of Engineering (Electrical and Electronic Engineering, Civil Engineering, Mechanical Engineering, Computer Engineering, Industrial Engineering, Management Engineering, Mechatronics Engineering and Software Engineering)
- ASIIN accreditation of associate degree programs in Biomedical Equipment Technology, Computer Programming, Electrical and Electronics Technology, Mapping and Cadastral Survey and Construction Technology, bachelor's programs in Information Systems and Technologies (in Turkish), Information Technology (in English) and Molecular Biology and Genetics (in English), and master's programs in Information Technology and Medical Biotechnology.
- AQAS accreditation of bachelor's programs in Pre-School Teacher Education (in Turkish), English Language Teaching (in English), and Interior Architecture (in both Turkish and English).
- FIBAA accreditation of bachelor's programs in Banking and Insurance, Finance and Banking, International Finance, Business Administration, Human Resource Management, International Trade and Business, Management Information System, Marketing, Public Administration, Economics, International Relations, Political Science, Tourism and Hospitality Management, and a master's program in Tourism Management.

All programs at the university are accredited by the Turkish Council of Higher Education (YÖK) and by the corresponding institution of Northern Cyprus, Higher Education Planning, Supervision, Accreditation and Coordination Board.

== Rankings ==
EMU Lala Mustafa Paşa (LMP) Sports Complex

Eastern Mediterranean University was included in the 601-800 band in the 2025 Times Higher Education World University Rankings of global universities, featuring over 2,000 institutions from 115 countries and territories across the world. This made it the top university in Northern Cyprus on this list, a position it has held consistently for many years. It also ranks in equal fifth place among Turkish universities on this list, after Koç University, Middle East Technical University, and Sabancı University (all in the 351-400 band) and Istanbul Technical University (in the 501-600 band). Also, the 2025 QS World University Rankings evaluated Eastern Mediterranean University within the 611-620 band, among more than 1,500 universities from 105 countries.

== Notable people ==
=== Notable alumni ===
- Sonnia Agu — Nigerian social entrepreneur
- Plestia Alaqad — Palestinian journalist
- Birsen Bekgöz — Turkish athlete
- Ese Brume — Nigerian athlete
- Obi Emelonye — Nigerian film director
- Ann El Safi — Sudanese journalist and writer
- Oytun Ersan — Turkish Cypriot bass guitarist and composer
- Buğra Gülsoy — Turkish actor, author, director, producer, and screenwriter
- Mehmet Harmancı — Mayor of the Nicosia Turkish Municipality
- Murat Șenkul — Mayor of the Kyrenia Turkish Municipality
- Mehmet Muş — Turkish MP and Minister of Trade (2021—2023)
- Ebru Polat — Turkish singer
- Diane Russet — Nigerian actor and producer
- Rahama Sadau — Nigerian actor and filmmaker
- Hripsime Stambulyan — Armenian politician and member of the National Assembly
- Bülent Turan — MP in Turkey
- Hasan Zaidi — Indian actor

=== Notable faculty ===
- Raif Denktaş — Turkish Cypriot composer, politician, and writer
- Tufan Erhürman — Lawyer and President of Northern Cyprus
- Arran Fernandez — British mathematician
- Halil Güven — Academic and former rector
- Kudret Özersay — Academic and politician
- Özdil Nami — Turkish Cypriot politician
- Skip Norman — African American filmmaker, visual anthropologist and educator
- Zehra Şonya — Turkish Cypriot sculptor
