= San Diego State University Georgia Campus =

Georgia campus of San Diego State University

San Diego State University Georgia
- Type: Satellite campus of SDSU
- Established: 2014
- Affiliations: California State University system, San Diego State University
- Dean: Ian Gibson
- Location: Tbilisi, Georgia; 41°42′17″N 44°47′24″E
- Campus: Urban
- Website: https://sdsu.edu.ge/
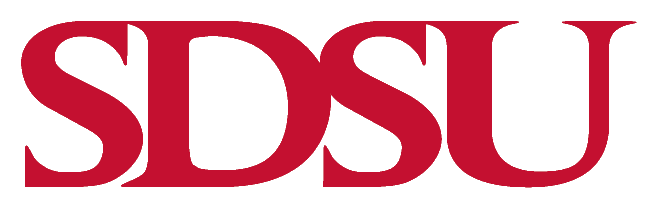

San Diego State University Georgia (SDSU-G), or SDSU Georgia, is a representation of San Diego State University (SDSU) in Tbilisi, Georgia, offering internationally accredited Bachelor of Science programs in the fields of science, technology, engineering, and mathematics (STEM) in the country of Georgia. These programs enable Georgian students to receive a high-quality STEM education and earn an American academic degree.

Founded in 2014, SDSU Georgia is funded through a compact signed between the United States of America's Millennium Challenge Corporation and the Government of Georgia.

== Academics ==
SDSU Georgia offers U.S.-accredited degree programs designed to prepare students for careers in science, technology, engineering, and mathematics (STEM). Academic programs are delivered in collaboration with three Georgian partner universities: Tbilisi State University (TSU), Ilia State University (ISU), and Georgian Technical University (GTU).

Current academic offerings include:

- Bachelor of Science in Computer Science
- Bachelor of Science in Computer Engineering
- Bachelor of Science in Civil Engineering
- Master of Science in Computer Engineering (GlobalFlex)

Courses are taught in English by faculty from San Diego State University and qualified faculty from Georgian partner universities. Students study in classrooms and laboratories designed to support instruction in engineering, computer science, and related STEM disciplines.

Since 2020, SDSU Georgia's partner universities have also offered their own U.S.-accredited STEM degree programs while continuing to collaborate with San Diego State University to strengthen STEM education in Georgia.

== Travel ==
Students are offered an opportunity to travel to San Diego, California, and complete one or more semesters of instruction at the main San Diego State University campus with the same tuition fee.

== See also ==
- San Diego State University
