= Local government reform (Cyprus) =

In July 2024 there was a major reform of local government in Cyprus, consisting of three strands. A new elected level for the districts of Cyprus, the creation of 18 new municipalities brought about by mergers (plus two retained from before) and, thirdly, 30 new combined authorities to provide joint services for the communities (i.e., village authorities or civil parishes).

== Pre-existing system ==
For a 100 years or more the system in Cyprus had been district administrations under the authority of a government appointed District Officer in each district, alongside a multiplicity of mostly small town and village authorities.

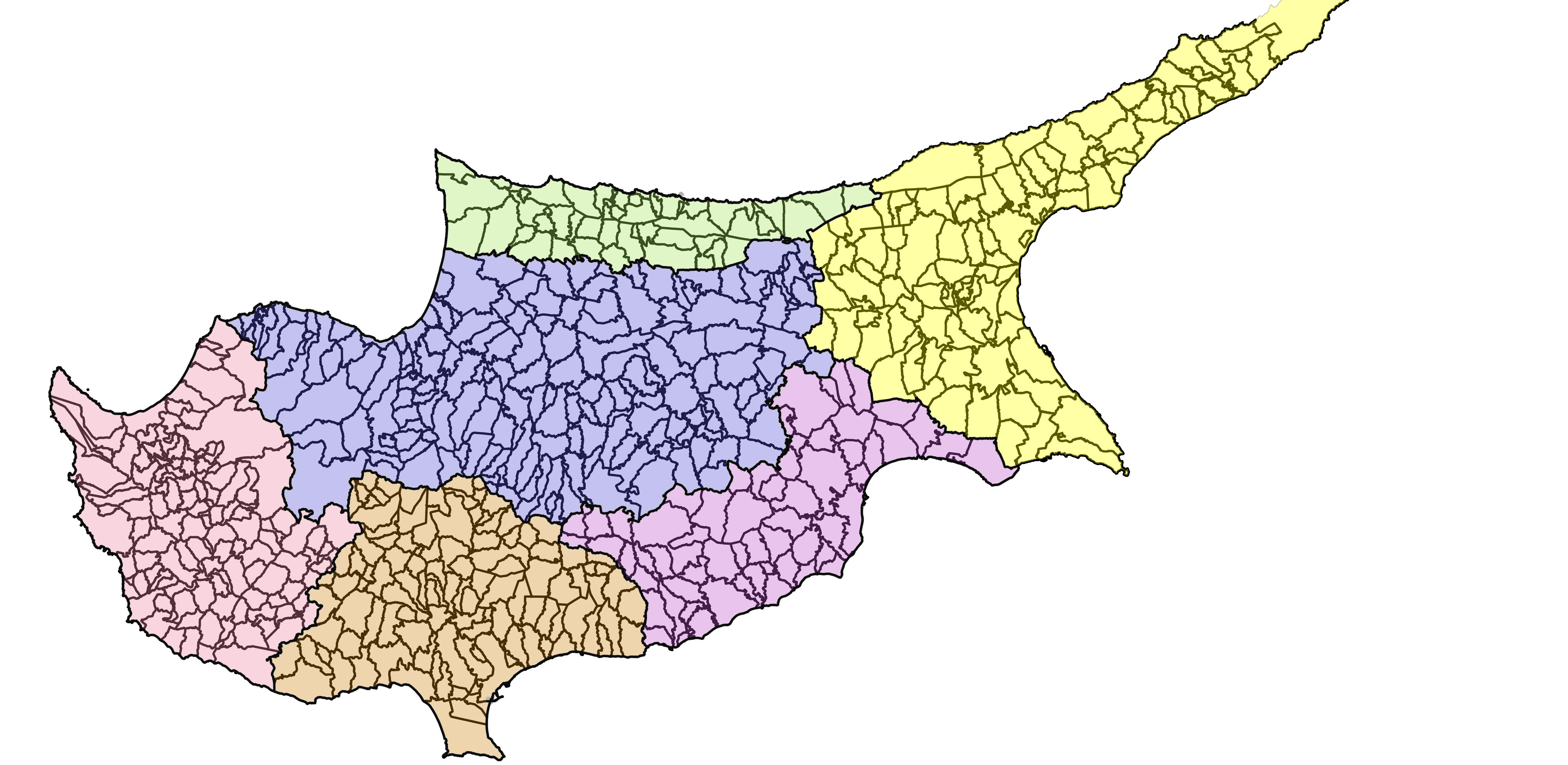
Map of the Cyprus local government system (Municipalities and Communities) prior to the 2024 local government reform

The table below shows the number of municipalities and communities in each district at various censuses, plus the totals from the list of municipal and community codes issued by the Cyprus Statistical Service. The latter includes abandoned or occupied villages, which nevertheless retain their village boundaries.

Number of Municipalities and Communities
DISTRICT	1881	1946	1960	1973	1992	2001	2011	2021	Codes
Nicosia	187	178	173	166	105	105	111	113	174
Kyrenia	47	48	48	47	...	...	...	...	47
Famagusta	116	98	98	98	9	9	9	9	98
Larnaca	45	60	60	61	52	54	55	56	59
Limassol	109	114	115	106	112	110	110	112	112
Paphos	140	135	132	126	108	110	116	120	125
TOTAL	644	633	626	604	386	388	401	410	615

The local government system consisted of unitary (single tier) urban municipal councils and rural community councils. There were 30 municipalities in the major towns, plus a further 9 municipalities in the occupied area. Municipalities are led by mayors. In 2011, there were 350 functioning community councils, and a further 25 communities with a population of zero or less than 104, with a further 137 for communities whose territory was located in the occupied area of Cyprus. The size of Cypriot local authorities was the fifth smallest in Europe, with only Turkey, France, Slovakia and the Czech Republic having smaller authorities in terms of population.

In Cyprus, the municipality average population was 19,950 (in 2011), the community average was 645 and the overall average was 2,075.6.

Because of their difference in size, communities had less power and resources than municipalities. Communities were generally responsible for waste disposal, water supply and public health. Municipalities were, in addition, responsible for social services, the issuing of building permits, and planning permission (in the case of large municipalities). However, many of these community services were provided by the district administration, where communities were unable to provide them themselves.

== New system ==
Local government reform was enacted by the Cypriot Parliament passing three bills in March 2022 and came into force on 1 July 2024, immediately after the local government elections on 09 June.

The local government reform is extended, with some limitations, to the British Sovereign Base Areas.

=== Districts ===
District councils called District Local Government Organisations were created in each district by the "Law on District Organisations of Local Government" of 2022. These councils took over the water boards and the water supply powers of municipalities and communities. They also took over the sewerage boards and the boards responsible for municipal waste disposal and recovery sites. The power to issue planning and building permits was transferred to these district councils. This includes all permits and regulations concerning the construction of streets and new buildings and their alteration or demolition.

Each district council consists of a president and 16 members including the vice-president. The president is directly elected to a 5-year term, firstly on 9 June 2024. 10 members of the councils are elected by a vote of the assembly of municipalities of the district and 6 are elected by a vote of the assembly of communities in the district, both assemblies convened for that purpose. The vice-president is elected by the members of the council after their election.

=== Municipalities ===
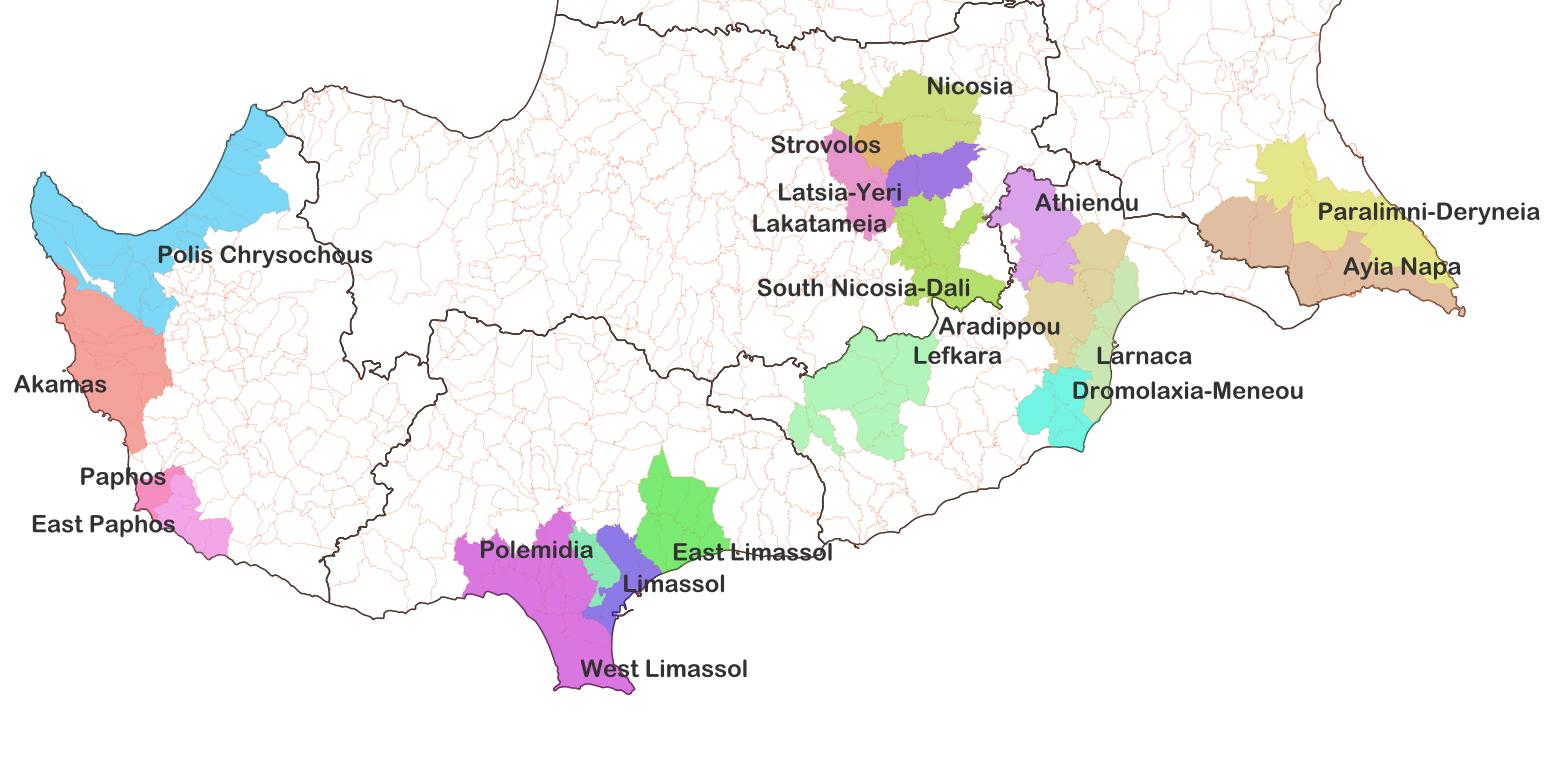
New Municipalities

The Municipalities Act of 2022 creates 18 new municipalities by amalgamating 28 municipalities and 63 communities, which become municipal districts of the new municipalities. The municipalities of Strovolos and Paphos remain unchanged. As a suburb of Nicosia, both mayors and some experts proposed that Strovolos be merged into Nicosia either as a single municipality or a federated metropolitan authority, but this was not adopted.

These 20 new or retained municipalities gain powers over the establishment of a municipal police, road maintenance, and the responsibilities of school boards (by 2029). The power to issue planning and building permits is transferred away from municipalities to the new District Local Government Organisations.

The municipal elections took place on 9 June 2024.

The table below lists the new municipalities and the previous authorities from which they are composed, which now become municipal districts with deputy mayors.

District	New Municipality	Municipal District	Pop 2021	Pre*	No. Councillors
Nicosia	LAKATAMEIA	TOTAL	53,105		30
Nicosia	Lakatameia	Anthoupolis	1,690	S	3
Nicosia	Lakatameia	Lakatameia	43,111	M	22
Nicosia	Lakatameia	Tseri	8,304	M	5
Nicosia	LATSIA–GERI	TOTAL	28,293		20
Nicosia	Latsia–Geri	Latsia	18,587	M	13
Nicosia	Latsia–Geri	Geri	9,706	M	7
Nicosia	NICOSIA	TOTAL	111,433		30
Nicosia	Nicosia	Aglandjia	21,544	M	6
Nicosia	Nicosia	Agios Dhometios	12,906	M	5
Nicosia	Nicosia	Engomi	20,504	M	5
Nicosia	Nicosia	Nicosia	56,479	M	14
Nicosia	SOUTH NICOSIA–IDALION	TOTAL	22,637		20
Nicosia	South Nicosia–Idalion	Alambra	1,655	C	2
Nicosia	South Nicosia–Idalion	Dali	12,350	M	8
Nicosia	South Nicosia–Idalion	Lympia	2,911	C	3
Nicosia	South Nicosia–Idalion	Nisou	2,132	C	2
Nicosia	South Nicosia–Idalion	Pera Chorio	3,002	C	3
Nicosia	South Nicosia–Idalion	Potamia	587	C	2
Nicosia	STROVOLOS	Strovolos	70,823	M	30
Famagusta	AGIA NAPA	TOTAL	22,636		20
Famagusta	Agia Napa	Achna	2,182	C	4
Famagusta	Agia Napa	Avgorou	4,925	C	4
Famagusta	Agia Napa	Agia Napa	4,716	M	4
Famagusta	Agia Napa	Liopetri	4,908	C	4
Famagusta	Agia Napa	Sotira	5,905	M	4
Famagusta	PARALIMNI–DERYNEIA	TOTAL	31,682		24
Famagusta	Paralimni–Deryneia	Acheritou	1,901	C	3
Famagusta	Paralimni–Deryneia	Deryneia	6,229	M	6
Famagusta	Paralimni–Deryneia	Frenaros	4,515	C	4
Famagusta	Paralimni–Deryneia	Paralimni	19,037	M	11
Larnaca	ARADIPPOU	TOTAL	24,510		20
Larnaca	Aradippou	Aradippou	22,932	M	16
Larnaca	Aradippou	Kellia	397	C	2
Larnaca	Aradippou	Troulloi	1,181	C	2
Larnaca	ATHIENOU	TOTAL	5,467		16
Larnaca	Athienou	Athienou	5,202	M	14
Larnaca	Athienou	Avdellero	265	C	2
Larnaca	DROMOLAXIA–MENEOU	TOTAL	17,026		20
Larnaca	Dromolaxia–Meneou	Dromolaxia-Meneou	6,838	M	8
Larnaca	Dromolaxia–Meneou	Kiti	5,136	C	6
Larnaca	Dromolaxia–Meneou	Perivolia, Larnaca	3,292	C	3
Larnaca	Dromolaxia–Meneou	Tersefanou	1,760	C	3
Larnaca	LARNACA	TOTAL	68,202		30
Larnaca	Larnaca	Larnaca	52,046	M	23
Larnaca	Larnaca	Livadia	8,581	M	4
Larnaca	Larnaca	Oroklini	7,575	C	3
Larnaca	LEFKARA	TOTAL	3,605		16
Larnaca	Lefkara	Delikipos	36	C	1
Larnaca	Lefkara	Kato Lefkara	119	C	1
Larnaca	Lefkara	Kornos	2,081	C	6
Larnaca	Lefkara	Lageia	36	C	1
Larnaca	Lefkara	Pano Lefkara	870	M	4
Larnaca	Lefkara	Skarinou	413	C	2
Larnaca	Lefkara	Vavla	50	C	1
Limassol	AMATHOUNTA	TOTAL	42,976		24
Limassol	Amathounta	Akrounta	521	C	1
Limassol	Amathounta	Armenochori	211	C	1
Limassol	Amathounta	Agios Athanasios	16,520	M	8
Limassol	Amathounta	Agios Tychonas	4,502	C	2
Limassol	Amathounta	Foinikaria	461	C	1
Limassol	Amathounta	Mathikoloni	202	C	1
Limassol	Amathounta	Mouttagiaka	3,239	C	3
Limassol	Amathounta	Germasogeia	17,329	M	7
Limassol	LIMASSOL	TOTAL	123,947		30
Limassol	Limassol	Limassol	107,970	M	24
Limassol	Limassol	Mesa Geitonia	15,925	M	5
Limassol	Limassol	Tserkezoi	52	C	1
Limassol	POLEMIDIA	TOTAL	26,593		20
Limassol	Polemidia	Kato Polemidia	23,174	M	16
Limassol	Polemidia	Pano Polemidia	3,419	C	4
Limassol	KOURION	TOTAL	34,729		20
Limassol	Kourion	Akrotiri	931	C	1
Limassol	Kourion	Asomatos, Limassol	895	C	1
Limassol	Kourion	Episkopi, Limassol	4,098	C	3
Limassol	Kourion	Erimi	3,159	C	2
Limassol	Kourion	Kantou	417	C	1
Limassol	Kourion	Kolossi	6,482	C	3
Limassol	Kourion	Sotira	232	C	1
Limassol	Kourion	Trachoni	4,549	C	3
Limassol	Kourion	Ypsonas	13,966	M	5
Paphos	AKAMAS	TOTAL	10,162		16
Paphos	Akamas	Akoursos	36	C	1
Paphos	Akamas	Ineia	319	C	2
Paphos	Akamas	Kathikas	387	C	2
Paphos	Akamas	Kato Arodes	46	C	1
Paphos	Akamas	Kissonerga	2,292	C	3
Paphos	Akamas	Pano Arodes	137	C	1
Paphos	Akamas	Pegeia	6,945	M	6
Paphos	IEROKIPIA	TOTAL	12,958		16
Paphos	Ierokipia	Acheleia	137	C	1
Paphos	Ierokipia	Agia Marinouda	425	C	1
Paphos	Ierokipia	Konia	2,754	C	3
Paphos	Ierokipia	Timi	1,063	C	2
Paphos	Ierokipia	Geroskipou	8,579	M	9
Paphos	PAPHOS	Paphos	37,991	M	24
Paphos	POLIS CHRYSOCHOUS	TOTAL	6,278		16
Paphos	Polis Chrysochous	Androlikou	28	C	1
Paphos	Polis Chrysochous	Argaka	1,081	C	2
Paphos	Polis Chrysochous	Agia Marina Chrysochous	591	C	1
Paphos	Polis Chrysochous	Chrysochou	116	C	1
Paphos	Polis Chrysochous	Drouseia	473	C	1
Paphos	Polis Chrysochous	Kritou Terra	68	C	1
Paphos	Polis Chrysochous	Makounta	71	C	1
Paphos	Polis Chrysochous	Nea Dimmata	55	C	1
Paphos	Polis Chrysochous	Neo Chorio, Pafos	522	C	1
Paphos	Polis Chrysochous	Pelathousa	53	C	1
Paphos	Polis Chrysochous	Polis Chrysochous	2,570	M	2
Paphos	Polis Chrysochous	Pomos	450	C	1
Paphos	Polis Chrysochous	Terra	18	C	1
Paphos	Polis Chrysochous	Gialia	182	C	1

*Note: Column "Pre" indicates previous status: M (municipality), C (community) or S (settlement)

=== Communities ===
Except for those amalgamated in the new municipalities, existing communities were preserved. 30 combined authorities called community complexes were created for the provision of common services to their participating communities, which are those listed in Schedule 6 of Communities (Amendment) (No. 2) Law of 2022. (See table below). Unlisted communities can be added by order of the Minister of the Interior.

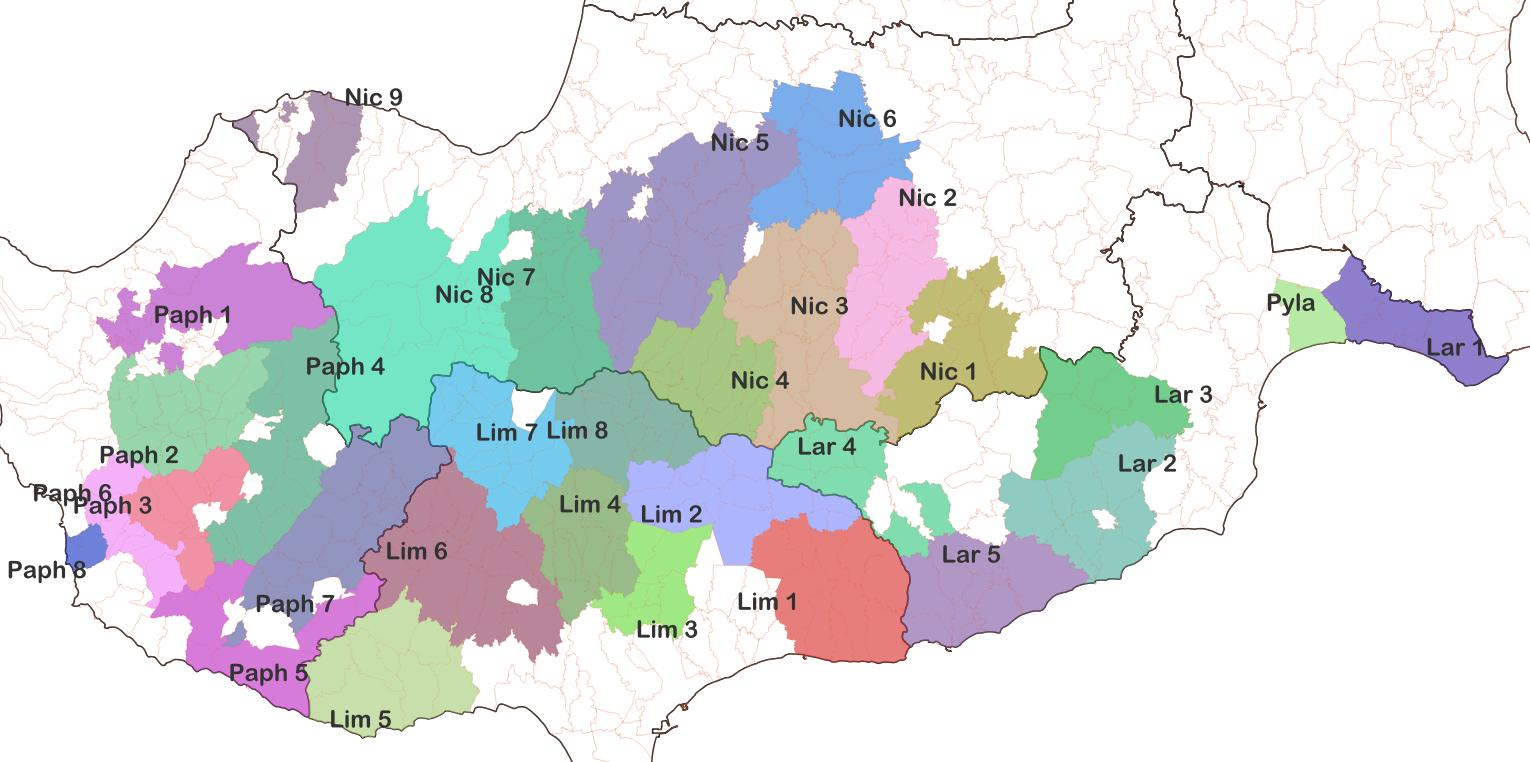
Map of the Community Service Complexes established by the 2024 local government reform

Complexes have the following functions:

- Waste collection management;
- provision of joint accounting and secretarial services;
- joint specialised technical support;
- health services;
- traffic control services;
- dogs regulation;
- provision of green areas for the complex.

Each complex is governed by the Services Complex Council, whose members are the mukhtars of the communities participating in the complex. They elect its president and vice-president by secret ballot. The council can choose a name for the complex.

The table below shows the member communities of each complex. The complexes are officially designated by their district name and a number using Greek Numerals (which are analogous to Roman Numerals). For clarity, normal Arabic numerals are used below. The list of complexes and their member communities is contained in the Schedule of the Communities (Amendment) (No. 2) Act of 2022.

Comp id	List of component Communities
Nic 1	Analiontas, Ayia Varvara, Kotsiatis, Lythrodontas, Maryi, Mathiatis, Sia
Nic 2	Anayeia, Episkopeio, Ergates, Kambia, Kapedes, Kato Deftera, Pano Deftera, Pera, Politiko, Psimolofou
Nic 3	Agrokipia, Arediou, Ayios Epifanios, Ayios Ioannis, Farmakas, Fikardou, Gourri, Kalo Chorio, Kambi, Klirou, Lazanias, Malounta, Mitsero
Nic 4	Alithinou, Alona, Apliki, Askas, Fterikoudi, Lagoudera, Livadia, Palaichori Morphou, Palaichori Oreinis, Platanistasa, Polystypos, Saranti
Nic 5	Akaki, Astromeritis, Ayia Eirini, Ayia Marina Xyliatou, Ayios Yeoryios Kafkallou, Kannavia, Kato Koutrafas, Kato Moni, Nikitari, Orounta, Peristerona, Potami, Vyzakia, Xyliatos
Nic 6	Ayioi Trimithias, Deneia, Kokkinotrimithia, Mammari, Meniko, Palaiometocho
Nic 7	Ayios Theodoros Soleas, Evrychou, Flasou, Galata, Kakopetria, Kaliana, Katydata, Korakou, Linou, Sinaoros, Spilia, Temvria
Nic 8	Kalopanayiotis, Kambos, Moutoullas, Mylikouri, Oikos, Pedoulas, Tsakistra, Yerakies
Nic 9	Kato Pyrgos, Mosfili, Pachyammos, Pano Pyrgos, Piyenia
Lar 1	Ormideia, Xylofagou, Xylotymvou
Lar 2	Alaminos, Alethriko, Anafotida, Anglisides, Kivisili, Klavdia, Kofinou, Mazotos, Menoyeia
Lar 3	Ayia Anna, Kalo Chorio, Mosfiloti, Psevdas, Pyrga
Lar 4	Ayioi Vavatsinias, Kato Drys, Melini, Odou, Ora, Vavatsinia
Lar 5	Ayios Theodoros, Choirokoitia, Kalavasos, Mari, Maroni, Psematismenos, Tochni, Zyyi
(Pyla)	Pyla (not in a Complex)
Lim 1	Asgata, Kellaki, Monagroulli, Moni, Parekklisia, Pentakomo, Prastio Kellakiou, Pyrgos, Sanida, Vasa Kellakiou
Lim 2	Akapnou, Arakapas, Ayios Konstantinos, Ayios Pavlos, Dierona, Eptagoneia, Kalo Chorio, Klonari, Louvaras, Sykopetra, Vikla, Zoopiyi
Lim 3	Apsiou, Fasoula, Palodeia, Paramytha, Spitali, Yerasa
Lim 4	Alassa, Apesia, Ayios Mamas, Ayios Yeoryios, Doros, Kapileio, Korfi, Laneia, Limnatis, Monagri, Silikou, Trimiklini
Lim 5	Alektora, Anogyra, Avdimou, Ayios Thomas, Paramali, Pissouri, Platanisteia, Prastio Avdimou
Lim 6	Arsos, Ayios Amvrosios, Ayios Therapon, Dora, Kissousa, Lofou, Malia, Omodos, Pachna, Pano Kivides, Potamiou, Souni-Zanakia, Vasa Koilaniou, Vouni, Yerovasa (Trozena)
Lim 7	Ayios Dimitrios, Foini, Kaminaria, Kato Platres (Tornarides), Koilani, Kouka, Lemithou, Mandria, Moniatis, Palaiomylos, Pano Platres, Pera Pedi, Prodromos, Treis Elies
Lim 8	Agridia, Agros, Amiantos, Ayios Ioannis, Ayios Theodoros, Chandria, Dymes, Kato Mylos, Kyperounta, Pelendri, Potamitissa
Pap 1	Choli, Filousa Chrysochous, Goudi, Kynousa, Lysos, Peristerona, Skoulli, Steni
Pap 2	Anadiou, Ayios Dimitrianos, Drinia, Drymou, Fyti, Kannaviou, Kato Akourdaleia, Kritou Marottou, Lasa, Milia, Miliou, Pano Akourdaleia, Polemi, Psathi, Simou, Stroumbi, Theletra, Yiolou
Pap 3	Choulou, Episkopi, Kallepeia, Kourdaka, Lemona, Letymvou, Tsada
Pap 4	Amaryeti, Asproyia, Axylou, Ayia Marina Kelokedaron, Eledio, Galataria, Koilineia, Pano Panayia, Pentalia, Statos-Ayios Fotios
Pap 5	Anarita, Ayia Varvara, Kouklia, Mandria, Mousere, Nata, Pano Archimandrita
Pap 6	Armou, Koili, Marathounta, Mesa Chorio, Mesoyi, Tala, Tremithousa
Pap 7	Arminou, Ayios Ioannis, Ayios Nikolaos, Ayios Yeoryios, Choletria, Fasoula, Filousa Kelokedaron, Kedares, Kelokedara, Kidasi, Mamonia, Mesana, Nikokleia, Praitori, Prastio, Salamiou, Stavrokonnou, Trachypedoula
Pap 8	Chlorakas, Emba

Details of each complex below. Population in 2021.

District	Comp	Gk No	Tot Pop	Complex Name	Seat	Largest comm	Pop
Nicosia	1	Α	8,385	Macheras	Ayia Varvara	Lythrodontas	3,124
Nicosia	2	Β	14,062	Tamasos	Deftera	Pano Deftera	3,007
Nicosia	3	Γ	7,454	Orini	Klirou	Klirou	1,895
Nicosia	4	Δ	1,682	Madari – Papoutsa	Palaichori Morphou	Palaichori Morphou	708
Nicosia	5	Ε	10,544	Morphou	Ayia Marina	Akaki	3,109
Nicosia	6	ΣΤ	14,755	Exapolis	Kokkinotrimithia	Kokkinotrimithia	4,817
Nicosia	7	Ζ	4,707	Solea	Evrychou	Kakopetria	1,255
Nicosia	8	Η	916	Northern Marathasa	Kalopanayiotis	Kalopanayiotis	201
Nicosia	9	Θ	1,096	Tillyria	Kato Pyrgos	Kato Pyrgos	919
Larnaca	1	Α	14,619	Dhekelia	Ormidea	Xylofagou	6,623
Larnaca	2	Β	7,211	South Stavrovouni	Mazotos	Alethriko	1,652
Larnaca	3	Γ	5,576	Tremithos River	Kalo Chorio	Kalo Chorio	1,535
Larnaca	4	Δ	766	Mountainous Larnaca	Ayii Vavatsinias	Odou	202
Larnaca	5	Ε	4,616	Vasilikou – Pentaschinos	Ziyi	Kalavasos	880
Larnaca	Pyla		3,869	Pyla	Pyla	Pyla	3,869
Limassol	1	Α	10,025	East Limassol	Parekklisia	Parekklisia	3,489
Limassol	2	Β	2,269	Amathos	Arakapas	Kalo Chorio	502
Limassol	3	Γ	4,234	Highland of Limassol	Palodeia	Palodeia	2,115
Limassol	4	Δ	2,977	Kouri & Xylouriko	Kapileio	Apesia	590
Limassol	5	Ε	3,547	West Limassol	Pissouri	Pissouri	2,038
Limassol	6	ΣΤ	4,706	Krasochoria	Pachna	Souni-Zanakia	1,245
Limassol	7	Ζ	1,712	Troodos	Foini	Foini	347
Limassol	8	Η	4,307	Mountainous Pitsilia Troodos	Agros	Kyperounta	1,372
Paphos	1	Α	1,106	Saint Ariston	Goudi	Peristerona	290
Paphos	2	Β	3,466	Semi-mountainous Paphos	Polemi	Polemi	870
Paphos	3	Γ	2,137	Ezousa	Tsada	Tsada	1,180
Paphos	4	Δ	1,070	Mountainous Paphos	Pentalia	Pano Panayia	392
Paphos	5	Ε	3,694	Aphrodite of Paphos	Anarita	Kouklia	1,211
Paphos	6	ΣΤ	8,542	Ayios Neophytos	Tremithousa	Tala	3,100
Paphos	7	Ζ	1,245	Diarizos and Xeros Valleys	Choletria	Choletria	256
Paphos	8	Η	12,380	West Paphos	Chlorakas	Chlorakas	6,421
