= 2016 Limassol municipal election =

Municipal election in Cyprus

← 2011	16 December 2016	2024 →
- Turnout: 48.66%
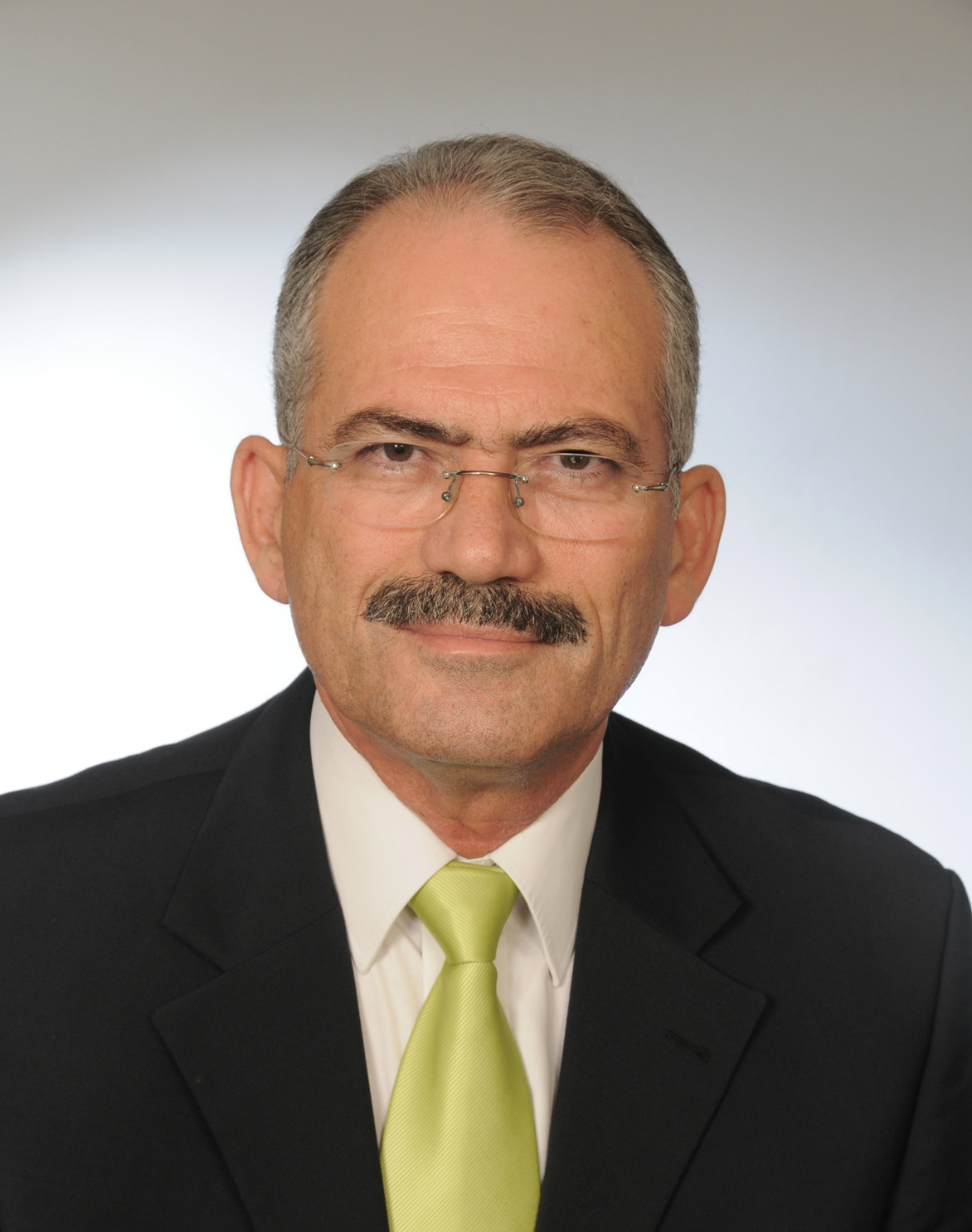

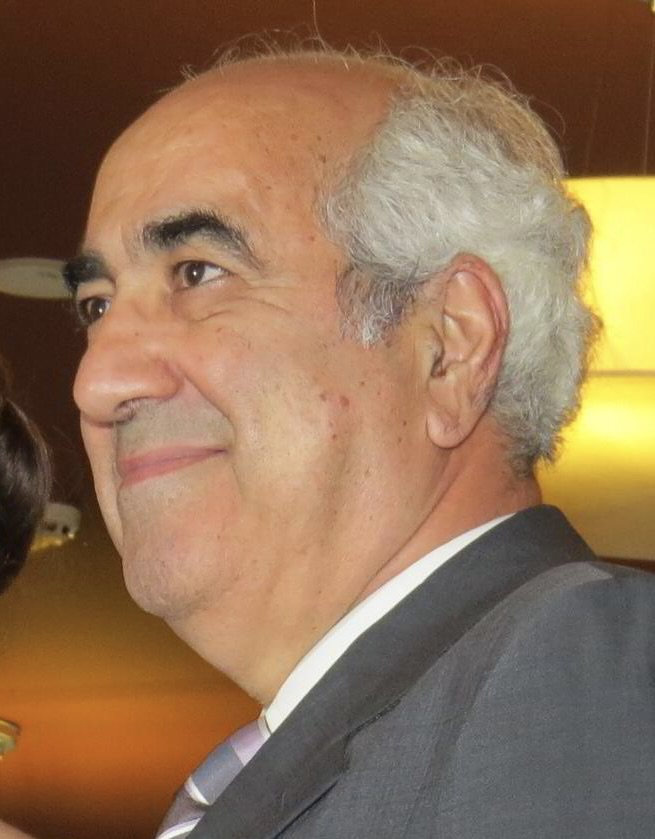
Candidate	Nicos Nicolaides	Andreas Christou
Party	Independent (Note: Supported by DISY, KOSP and Solidarity Movement.)	Independent (Note: Supported by AKEL, DIKO and EDEK.)
Popular vote	13,920	13,911
Percentage	48.30%	48.27%
Mayor before election
Andreas Christou
Independent
Elected mayor
Nicos Nicolaides
Independent

The 2016 Limassol Municipal election was a municipal election that took place in Limassol on December 16, 2016, alongside other local elections. Independent candidate Nicos Nicolaides narrowly won the mayorship, securing 48.30% of the vote, defeating two-term incumbent Andreas Christou, who garnered 48.27%. Nicolaides won by a margin of just 9 votes.

== Background ==
Three independent candidates contested the 2016 Limassol municipal election: Andreas Christou, Nicos Nicolaides and Charis Aristidou. Christou, who had served as mayor since 2007, sought re-election for a third term, but was narrowly defeated by Nicolaides.

Nicos Nicolaides, although a former MP of the centre-left EDEK, did not receive the party's support. Instead, he was backed by the then-ruling DISY, the Green party, the Solidarity Movement and Limassol Architects Movement. Incumbent Andreas Christou received support from AKEL, DIKO and EDEK.

== Results ==
Candidate	Party	Votes	%
Nicos Nicolaides	Independent (Note: Supported by DISY, KOSP and Solidarity Movement.)	13,920	48.30
Andreas Christou	Independent (Note: Supported by AKEL, DIKO and EDEK.)	13,911	48.27
Charis Aristidou	Independent	986	3.42
Total		28,817	100.00
Valid votes		28,817	93.68
Invalid votes		434	1.41
Blank votes		1,510	4.91
Total votes		30,761	100.00
Registered voters/turnout		63,208	48.67
Source: Official Results
