= Circassians in Cyprus =

Circassian diaspora in Cyprus

Къыбрысым ис Адыгэхэр Kıbrıs Çerkesleri Κιρκάσιοι στην Κύπρο

Total population
- 2,600+ (1864); 218 (1865); 58 (1946; in Tserkezoi)

Regions with significant populations
- Tserkezoi, Mouttagiaka (Historically); Modern descendants scattered

Languages
- Circassian (Historically); Turkish, Greek

Religion
- Islam (Sunni)

Circassians in Cyprus (Adyghe: Къыбрысым ис Адыгэхэр; Turkish: Kıbrıs Çerkesleri; Greek: Κιρκάσιοι στην Κύπρο), refers to the Circassian community in Cyprus. Out of the thousands of Circassian refugees who immigrated to Cyprus following the Circassian genocide, only 218 had survived by 1865, the rest perished due to disease, local opposition, and lack of water or food. Today, the few descendants of the community have been culturally Turkified.

== History ==
Since the 18th century, the Russian Empire had sought to conquer the Caucasus, culminating in the Russo–Circassian War and the final defeat of the Circassian resistance in 1864. Following the Circassian genocide, hundreds of thousands of Circassians and other North Caucasian peoples were forced into exile, seeking refuge in the Ottoman Empire. They were initially sent to Black Sea ports like Trabzon and Samsun before being distributed across the empire, including to the island of Cyprus.

In January 1860, the Ottoman Empire established the Immigrant Commission (Muhacirin Komisyonu) under the leadership of Hafız Mehmet Paşa, himself of Circassian origin, to manage the massive influx of refugees. In May 1860, the people of Cyprus donated 4,315 kuruş to aid Circassian and Nogai immigrants arriving in the Ottoman Empire.

While Cyprus was initially considered a highly desirable location for the resettlement of Circassian refugees, the actual process was marred by severe logistical failures, mass casualties, and fierce opposition from the island's Christian population. The Ottoman Empire still wanted to settle some of the Circassians in Cyprus but most of the settlers died: abuses at the hands of malicious captains were also reported. In one case, a ship bound for Cyprus was found with mutilated and decapitated bodies, confirming rumors of refugees being tied up and thrown overboard while still alive. Only a third of the passengers on this ship managed to survive.

The French Consul in Larnaca, Cyprus, argued that Muslim Circassians would disrupt the peace and formally requested the French embassy in Istanbul and French commissioners in Beirut to block their arrival. He threatened the local governor (Mutasarrıf) of Nicosia with French military intervention from Syria. Similarly, the US Vice Consul, T. B. Lane, reported panic among the Christian population and requested a British warship.

Despite this opposition, the Ottoman government continued its plans. Following the final Russian victory in 1864, unprecedented numbers of refugees flooded into Trabzon and Samsun. Overcrowding led to massive outbreaks of typhus, smallpox, and dysentery, causing tens of thousands of deaths, as reported by Dr. Barozzi, the health inspector of the Supreme Board of Health. The tragedy was widely covered in the British press, which noted that a portion of these refugees would be sent to Cyprus.

On October 7, 1864, a convoy arrived in Larnaca from Samsun. The convoy was led by a Greek-flagged steam tugboat named Samson (captained by Athanase A. Foca), which towed three twin-masted sailing ships. The ships were carrying up to 2,700 Circassians. The arrival of the ships caused mass panic among the Greek population and consuls in Cyprus, who pressured the local director to delay the refugees' landing. When the refugees were finally allowed to disembark, they were described as "moving corpses" and "more dead than alive". A 12-member Muslim commission and a doctor, Dr. Botalico, were appointed to assist them. The refugees were emaciated, barefoot, and suffering from severe dehydration. Leon de Maricourt, son of the French consul, recounted visiting the quarantine area and seeing "skeletons covered in earthy parchment" lying on sharp pebbles under the scorching sun.

Investigations revealed that the three sailing ships had been packed with five times their capacity. Many refugees died en route and were thrown overboard. After landing, 25 to 30 people died daily. Corpses washing ashore in Cyprus, Limni, Samos, and Rhodes were found with bound hands and feet, stab wounds, and signs of strangulation, suggesting that captains and crews murdered the refugees. The Larnaca authorities demanded that the captains be severely punished upon their return to Istanbul.

The tragedy was heavily reported in international media, including the Journal de Constantinople, Daily News, The Standard, Sheffield and Rotherham Independent, Otago Witness, The Glasgow Herald, The Derby Mercury, The Morning Post, The Times, Levant Herald, and the Russian Russki Invalid. The press blamed the Ottoman Immigrant Commission for sending 2,700 people on three 200-ton ships on a months-long journey, and condemned the captains' cruelty. Meanwhile, the Ottoman state-supported newspaper Ruzname-i Ceride-i Havadis attempted to deny the severity of the events, claiming it was impossible to fit so many people on such small ships. British Ambassador W. Stuart pressured Grand Vizier Ali Pasha for an investigation. The resulting Ottoman health commission report downplayed the atrocities, claiming there was no shortage of food or water (even stating 28 boxes of biscuits were returned untouched), denying that bodies were mutilated, and attributing the deaths solely to disease. The commission claimed that of the 2,718 who left Samsun, 202 died before Istanbul, 528 were transferred to other ships, 637 died between Istanbul and Cyprus, and 1,351 arrived. However, by December 1865, the Cyprus Council reported that out of the 2,600+ refugees initially sent, only 218 had survived. Once the Circassians landed in Cyprus, local Muslim inhabitants took in Circassian orphans from the transport.

The surviving 218 Circassians refused to be separated from one another. The Limassol district council purchased a farm belonging to a Christian named Pavlaki for 100,000 kuruş. The property included 810 dönüms of waqf land, 160 dönüms of miri land, 1,000 dönüms of empty land, fruit trees (lemon, olive, carob), vineyards, houses, and running water. Sixty families were settled on this farm, which became known as the Çerkes Çiftliği (Circassian Farm). The local Muslims donated to help the farm. By December 1865, houses had been built and seeds distributed, with the refugees receiving daily allowances until their first harvest.

During the 1877–1878 Russo-Turkish War, Circassians who had previously been settled in the Balkans were targeted by Russian forces and Bulgarian rebels, forcing them to flee. In March 1878, news that 3,000 Circassians had been dispatched to Cyprus on the Austrian ship Flora sparked massive protests from the Greek population, led by Bishop Kipriyanos of Kition. A petition with 130 signatures from Larnaca residents said that this "savage and bloodthirsty race" would destroy the island's peace. British and French consuls strongly intervened. Pressured by European diplomats, particularly French Ambassador Fournier, the Ottoman government relented. The Austrian steamship Timavo, carrying 2,000 refugees, was diverted to Antalya, as were another 600 refugees initially destined for Cyprus.

In April 1894, a group of orphans and descendants of the original 1864 settlers petitioned the Ottoman Grand Vizier. They stated that only one-tenth of the original Circassians remained on the farm. British census data clearly tracks the demographic collapse of the Circassian Farm:

| Year | Occupied Houses / Families | Total Population | Demographic Breakdown | Notes |
|---|---|---|---|---|
| 1881 | 28 houses | 69 | 40 men, 29 women | |
| 1891 | 14 houses | 36 | 22 Muslim men, 12 Muslim women, 2 non-Muslim men | |
| 1901 | 9 houses | 36 | 31 Muslims, 5 non-Muslims | |
| 1911 | 2 houses | 15 | 5 Muslims, 10 non-Muslims | The Muslim population had become a minority. |
| 1921 | 7 houses | 23 | 5 Muslims, 18 non-Muslims | |
| 1931 | 7 houses | 29 | 16 Muslims, 13 non-Muslims | |
| 1946 | 19 families | 58 | 17 Muslims, 41 Greek Orthodox | |

== Modern Situation ==
Much of the historical understanding regarding the final years of the Circassian Farm comes from oral history recorded by researcher Muhittin Tolga Özsağlam in 2011, based on accounts from a descendant of the Circassian Kansot family (Adyghe: Къаншъот). According to these records, the early settlement was highly organized; the community pooled its own funds to construct a mosque and a cemetery, and successive generations of the Kansot family served as muhtars (headmen) to manage the farm's affairs. However, the settlement declined due to the systematic loss of Circassian-owned land. A local Greek businessman named Lanidis gradually bought up individual shares of the farm and seized unsold portions. Lanidis also built a pig farm between the mosque and the cemetery, though the community successfully sued him in a British court to have it removed. Eventually forced to abandon the farm entirely, the remaining Circassians relocated to villages such as Mutlukaya and began a rapid process of assimilation. Because there were no Circassian educational institutions, children attended local Greek or Turkish schools. During this period, families adopted the surname "Çerkez" or "Çerkes" (meaning "Circassian"). Fearing prejudice or alienation from Turks, they predominantly spoke Turkish in public. The Circassian language was strictly relegated to the home and was eventually lost entirely, replaced by Turkish. During the intercommunal conflicts of the mid-20th century, Cypriot Circassians actively participated in the Turkish Resistance Organization (TMT). Later, when Turkish forces landed in Cyprus in 1974, the source met with Turkish commanders of Circassian descent, who gifted him books about Çerkes Ethem. While entirely assimilated, the descendants maintain pride in their Circassian heritage and celebrated the modern independence of Abkhazia. They expect the governments of Cyprus and Northern Cyprus to look after the declining community.
