= Amathounta =

Cypriot municipality

Amathounta Municipality Δήμος Αμαθούντας
- Municipality
- Country: Cyprus
- District: Limassol District
- Established: 1 July 2024
- Named for: Amathus
- Municipal seat: Agios Athanasios

Government
  - Type: Mayor–council
  - Body: Municipal Council of Amathounta
  - Mayor: Kyriakos Xydias
  - Deputy Mayors: List: Marinos Kyriakou; Christos Papamichail; Iraklis Irakleous; Nikos Nikolaidis; Chrystalla Anaiti; Neofytos Pafitis; Marios Rotis; Christos Champou

Population (2021)
  - Total: 42,976
- Time zone: UTC+2 (EET)
  - Summer (DST): UTC+3 (EEST)
- Website: amathounta.org.cy

Amathounta Municipality (Greek: Δήμος Αμαθούντας) is a municipality located in the Limassol District of Cyprus. Headquartered in Agios Athanasios, it is composed of eight municipal districts: Agios Athanasios, Germasogeia, Agios Tychonas, Akrounta, Mathikoloni, Mouttagiaka, Foinikaria, and Armenochori.

== Formation ==
Following the implementation of the Local Government Reform and the entry into force, on 1 July 2024, of the new legislative framework—comprising the Municipalities Law, the Communities Law, and the Law on District Local Government Organisations—the former municipalities of Agios Athanasios and Germasogeia, together with the former communities of Agios Tychonas, Akrounta, Mathikoloni, Mouttagiaka, Foinikaria, and Armenochori, were merged to form Amathounta Municipality, which was established on the same date.

== Government ==
The Municipality is governed by the 25-member Municipal Council of Amathounta and it consists of the incumbent mayor Kyriakos Xydias, the deputy mayors of Agios Athanasios, Germasogeia, Agios Tychonas, Akrounta, Mathikoloni, Mouttagiaka, Foinikaria and Armenochori, and the Municipal Councilors.
