= Munirudeen Adesola Lawal =

Nigerian monarch (1956)

13th Timi of Ede
- Reign: January 2008 –
- Coronation: 5 March 2008
- Predecessor: Tijani Oladokun Oyewusi
- Born: 10 February 1956; Ede, Southern Region, Colony and Protectorate of Nigeria
- House: Laminisa
- Religion: Islam
- Occupation: Teaching

Munirudeen Adesola Lawal (born February 10, 1956) is a Nigerian monarch. He is the 13th Timi of Ede.

== Early life and education ==
Munirudeen Adesola Lawal was born on 10 February 1956 to the family of Prince Kareem Abefe Lawal of the Laminisa ruling house and Abibat Akanke Lawal from Ile Imole compound in Ede in present-day Osun State, Nigeria. He commenced his primary school education at LA Primary School, Obada Ede from where he proceeded to Seventh Day Adventist Grammar School, Ede and in 1968, he subsequently gained admission to Baptist High School, Ede, where he eventually completed his secondary school education in 1973 and subsequently obtained his Higher School Certificate(HSC) in 1975.

In 1978, he enrolled into the Adeyemi College of Education to study mathematics and chemistry education. He later gained admission to Bayero University where he obtained a degree in library studies and mathematics in 1984. In 1988, he enrolled for and obtained a master's degree in business administration from Obafemi Awolowo University (OAU), Ile-Ife.

== Career ==
In 1973 upon the completion of his secondary school, Munirudeen Adesola Lawal got an appointment into Universal Insurance Company, where he was trained as a policy seller. In October 1975, upon the completion of his HSC, he later got a job with the Osun Central Schools’ Board and was posted to Timi Agbale Grammar School as a mathematics and further mathematics teacher. He subsequently worked in Oba laoye Grammar School, Ede between 1991 and 1992; and later secured a job at the Polytechnic Iree in December, 1992, as lecturer 2, teaching mathematics and other courses and was there until January 2008 when he was named the Timi of Ede.

== Personal life ==
Munirudeen Adesola Lawal is a Muslim and he is married with children.
