= Yiannis Armeftis =

Cypriot architect and politician

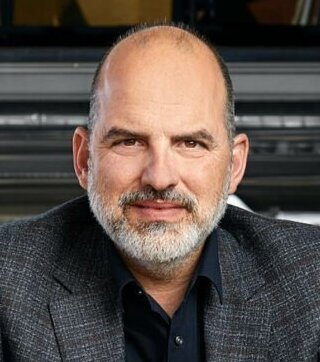

18th Mayor of Limassol
- Incumbent
- Assumed office 1 July 2024
- Preceded by: Nicos Nicolaides

Personal details
- Born: 1971 (age 54–55) Limassol, Cyprus
- Party: Independent
- Education: Aristotle University of Thessaloniki
- Profession: Architect
- Website: yiannisarmeftis.com

Yiannis Armeftis (Greek: Γιάννης Αρμεύτης; born 1971) is a Greek Cypriot architect who has served as the Mayor of Limassol since 1 July 2024.

== Political career ==
Armeftis served as a municipal councillor of Limassol from 2007 to 2016, during Andreas Christou's mayoral tenure. During this time, he was President of the Development and Tourism Committee, head of DIKO's Municipal Group, and the Union of Municipalities' representative on the Council for the Study of Deviations.

In the municipal election on June 9, 2024, he ran as an independent candidate supported by AKEL, DIKO, EDEK, and Volt Cyprus. He won the election with 48% of the votes, surpassing incumbent Nicos Nicolaides, who received 43%, and Christos Michaelides, who garnered 8%.
