= Timi (disambiguation) =

Timi or TIMI may refer to:

== Places ==
- Timi, a village in Cyprus

== People ==
- Filippo Timi (born 1974), Italian actor and writer
- Timi Max Elšnik (born 1998), Slovenian footballer
- Timi Hansen (1958–2019), Danish bass player
- Timi Lahti (born 1990), Finnish footballer
- Timi Melei, Tuvaluan politician
- Timi Odusina (born 1999), English footballer
- Timi Sobowale (born 2002), Irish footballer
- Timi Yuro, stage name of American singer-songwriter Rosemary Timothy Yuro (1940–2004)
- Timi Zhuo (born 1981), Taiwanese singer

== Other uses ==
- TIMI or Thrombolysis In Myocardial Infarction, a research organization with headquarters in Boston
- TIMI (Technology Independent Machine Interface), an IBM hardware abstraction layer
- TiMi Studios, a video game development studio
