= Armenochori =

Armenochori may refer to the following places:

- Armenochori, Cyprus, a village in the Limassol district, Cyprus
- Armenochori, Greece, a village in the Florina regional unit, Greece
