= Agios Athanasios, Cyprus =

Agios Athanasios Άγιος Αθανάσιος (Greek)
- Municipal District
- Interactive map of Agios Athanasios
- Location within Cyprus Location within the Eastern Mediterranean Location within the European Union Location within Asia
- Coordinates: 34°42′31″N 33°03′01″E
- Country: Cyprus
- District: Limassol District
- Urban area: Limassol

Government
  - Deputy Mayor: Marinos Kyriakou

Area
  - Municipal District: 14.34 km^{2} (5.54 sq mi)

Population (2011)
  - Municipal District: 14,347
  - Density: 1,000/km^{2} (2,591/sq mi)
- Time zone: UTC+2 (EET)
  - Summer (DST): UTC+3 (EEST)

Agios Athanasios (Greek: Άγιος Αθανάσιος) is a municipal district of Amathounta Municipality of Cyprus located in the Limassol District. Situated 3 km (1.86 mi) away from the district's capital, Limassol, and named after the Athanasius of Alexandria, it functioned as a suburb of the city of Limassol and as an independent municipality from 1986 until 1 July 2024, when following Local Government Reform, it became a municipal district of the Amathounta Municipality. It also boasts an industrial zone with more than 110 employers.

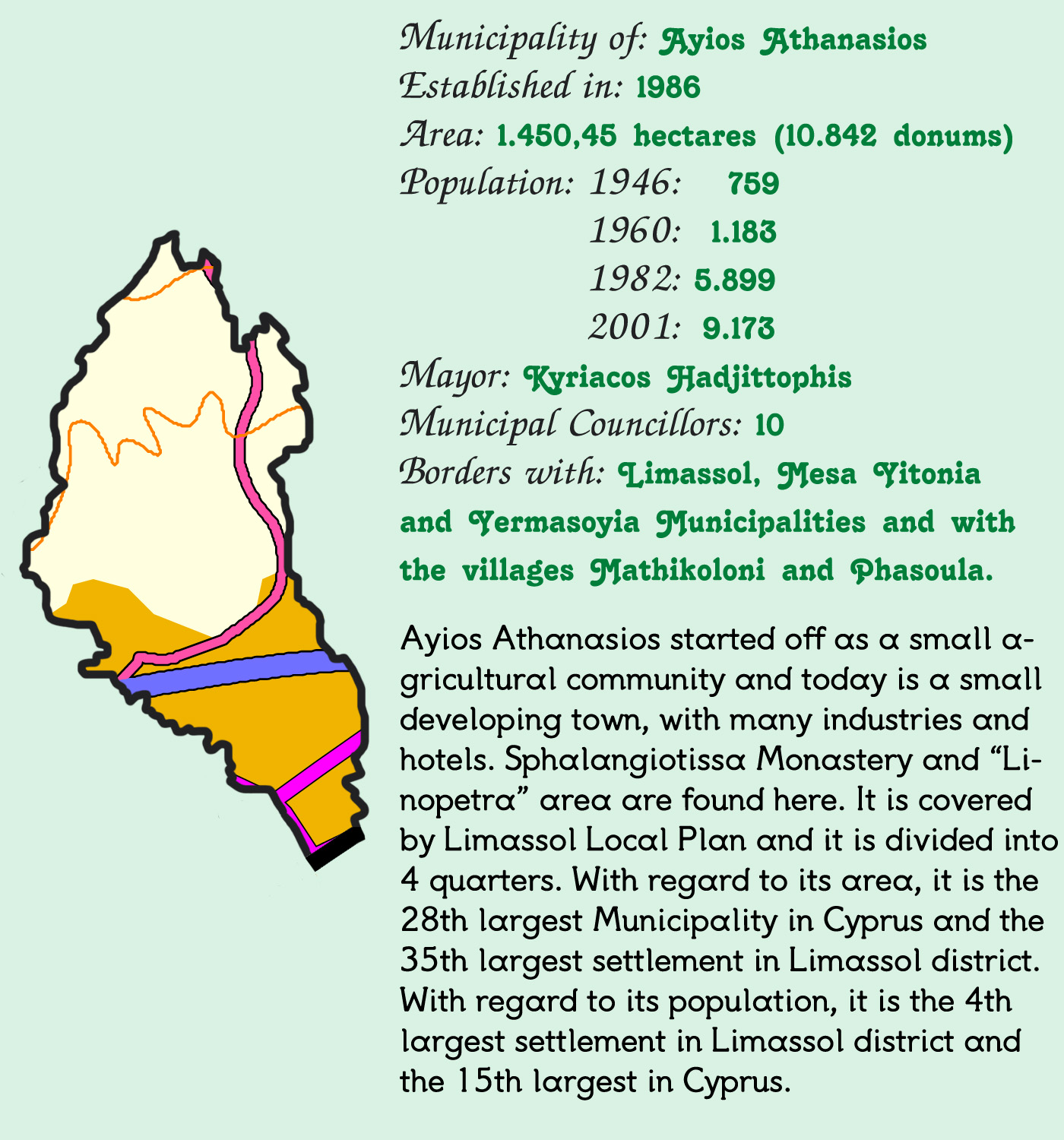
Concise presentation of Agios Athanasios

== History ==
Agios Athanasios was founded as a minor agricultural settlement and followed a huge refugee immigration boom after the 1974 Turkish invasion. It is estimated that around 6,000 refugees are settled in the city. The municipality serves as the industrial area of the Limassol District.

== Mayors ==
- 1986–1996: Phidias Diamantis
- 1996–2016: Kyriakos Chatzittofi
- 2016–2024: Marinos Kyriakou

== Deputy Mayors ==
- 2024–Present: Marinos Kyriakou
