= 2024 Limassol municipal election =

Local election in Cyprus

- 9 June 2024
- Turnout: 56.63% ▲7.97
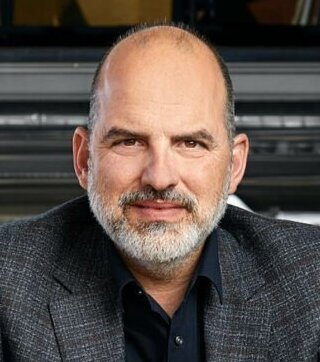

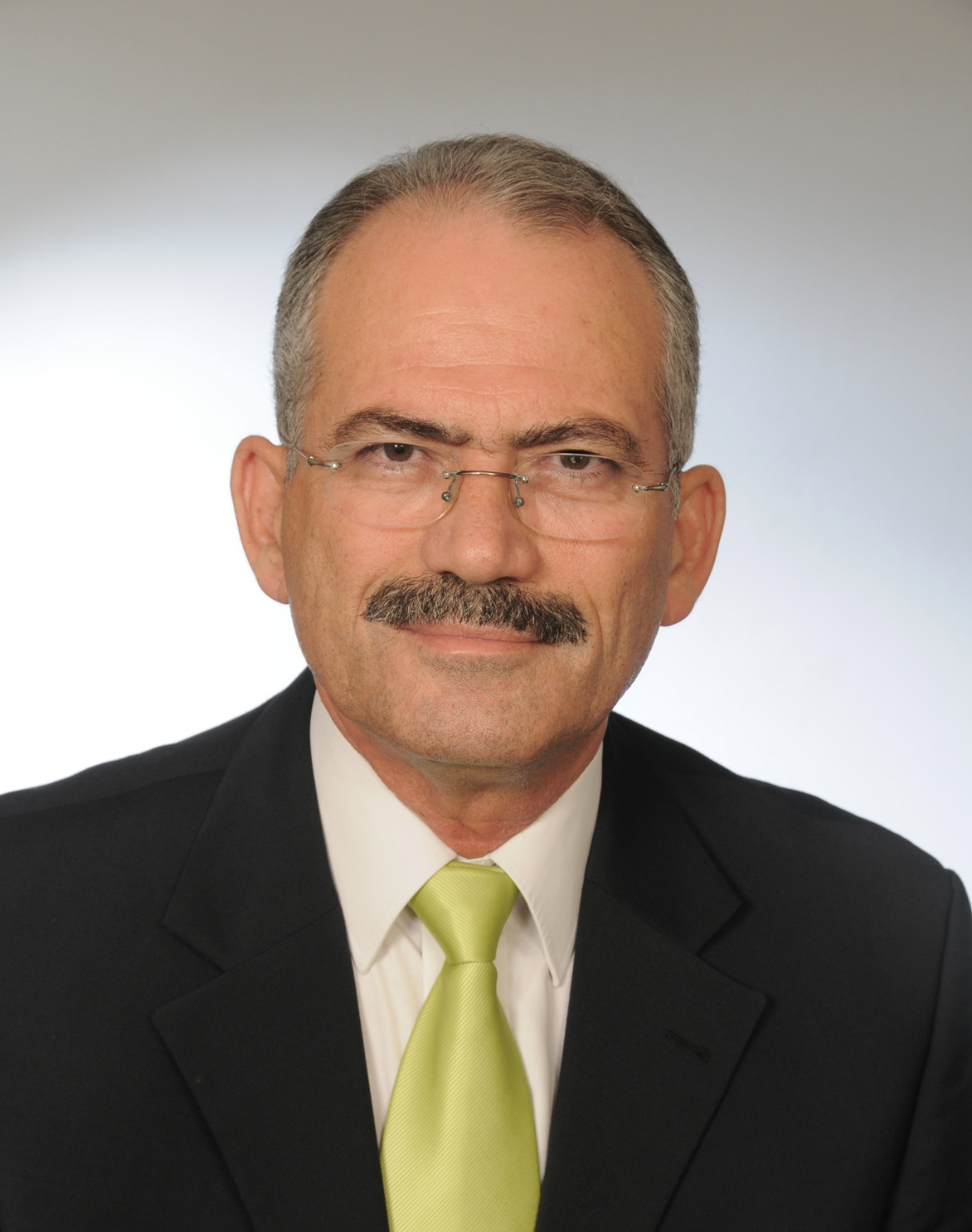
Candidate	Yiannis Armeftis	Nicos Nicolaides
Party	Independent	Independent
Popular vote	16,561	14,772
Percentage	48.48%	43.25%
Mayor before election
Nicos Nicolaides
Independent
Elected mayor
Yiannis Armeftis
Independent

The 2024 Limassol Municipal election was a municipal election that took place in Limassol on June 9, 2024, alongside the 2024 European elections and other local elections. These elections had been postponed from December 2021 pending local government reform. Independent candidate Yiannis Armeftis ultimately won the mayorship with 48.5% of the votes.

== Background ==
Three independent candidates contested the 2024 Limassol municipal election: Yiannis Armeftis, Nicos Nicolaides and Christos Michaelides. Nicolaides, who had served as mayor of Limassol since 2016, ran for re-election but was ultimately defeated by Armeftis.

Architect Yiannis Armeftis was backed by AKEL, DIKO, EDEK, and Volt Cyprus. Incumbent Nicos Nicolaides received support from DISY and DIPA, while Christos Michaelides was supported by KOSP.

== Results ==
Candidate	Party	Votes	%
Yiannis Armeftis	Independent (Note: Supported by AKEL, DIKO, EDEK and Volt Cyprus)	16,561	48.48
Nicos Nicolaides	Independent (Note: Supported by DISY and DIPA)	14,772	43.25
Christos Michaelides	Independent (Note: Supported by KOSP)	2,825	8.27
Total		34,158	100.00
Valid votes		34,158	91.64
Invalid votes		602	1.61
Blank votes		2,516	6.75
Total votes		37,276	100.00
Registered voters/turnout		71,535	52.11
Source: https://live.elections.moi.gov.cy/
