= Mavri Sinia =

Mavri Schinia
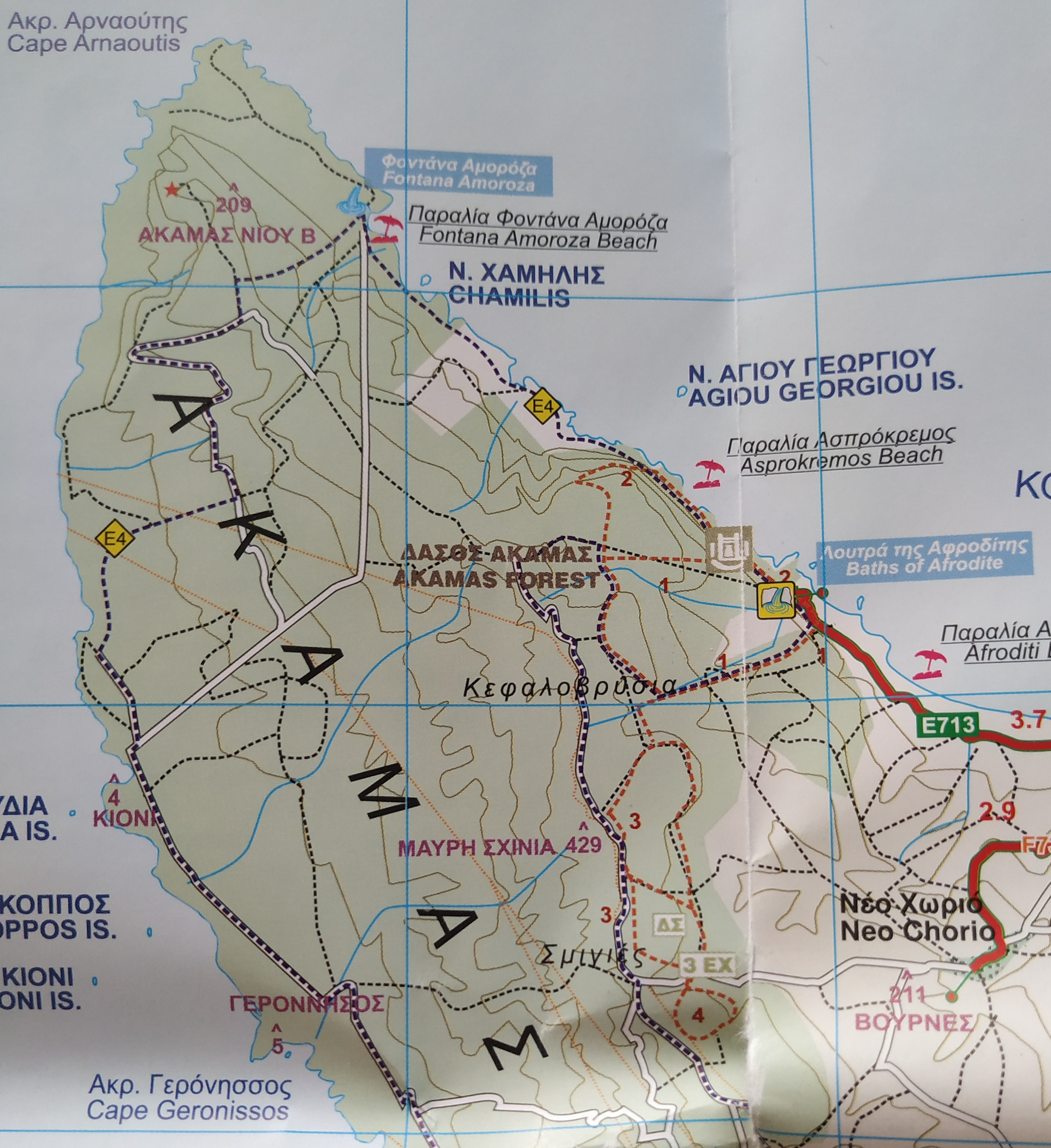
- Nickname: Mavri Sinia
- Mountain in Neo Chorio
- Coordinates: 35°02′10″N 32°19′38″E
- Country: Cyprus
- District: Paphos District
- Elevation: 429 m (1,407 ft)
- Time zone: UTC+2 (EET)
  - Summer (DST): UTC+3 (EEST)

Mavri Sinia or Mavri Schinia is a mountain in Neo Chorio in the Paphos District of Cyprus. Its peak elevation is 429 metres (1,407 ft) above sea level. The terrain around Mavri Schinia is hilly on the east, but flat in the west and the sea is in the northwest. Lára is the highest point nearby at an elevation of 669 metres (2,195 ft). The average rainfall here is 631 millimetres (24.8 in) annually. January is the wettest month with an average of 141 millimetres (5.6 in) precipitation. August is the driest with only 2 millimetres (0.08 in) precipitation. The nearest larger community is Pegeia 17.7 kilometres (11.0 mi) south of Mavri Schinia. Neo Chorio is 4.4 kilometres (2.7 mi) from Mavri Schinia.

== Climate ==
Climate data for Mavri Sinia, Cyprus (429 m)
| Month | Jan | Feb | Mar | Apr | May | Jun | Jul | Aug | Sep | Oct | Nov | Dec | Year |
|---|---|---|---|---|---|---|---|---|---|---|---|---|---|
| Mean daily maximum °F (°C) | 59 (15) | 59 (15) | 61 (16) | 66 (19) | 72 (22) | 79 (26) | 82 (28) | 84 (29) | 81 (27) | 75 (24) | 70 (21) | 63 (17) | 71 (22) |
| Mean daily minimum °F (°C) | 45 (7) | 43 (6) | 45 (7) | 50 (10) | 55 (13) | 63 (17) | 66 (19) | 68 (20) | 64 (18) | 59 (15) | 54 (12) | 48 (9) | 55 (13) |
| Average precipitation inches (mm) | 5.6 (141) | 3.4 (86) | 2.0 (50) | 1.2 (31) | 1.7 (43) | 0.4 (9) | 0.1 (2) | 0.1 (2) | 0.1 (3) | 2.0 (51) | 3.5 (90) | 4.8 (123) | 24.9 (631) |
Source: https://neo.sci.gsfc.nasa.gov/dataset_index.php
