= Akrounta =

Akrounta Ακρούντα
- Village and Municipal District
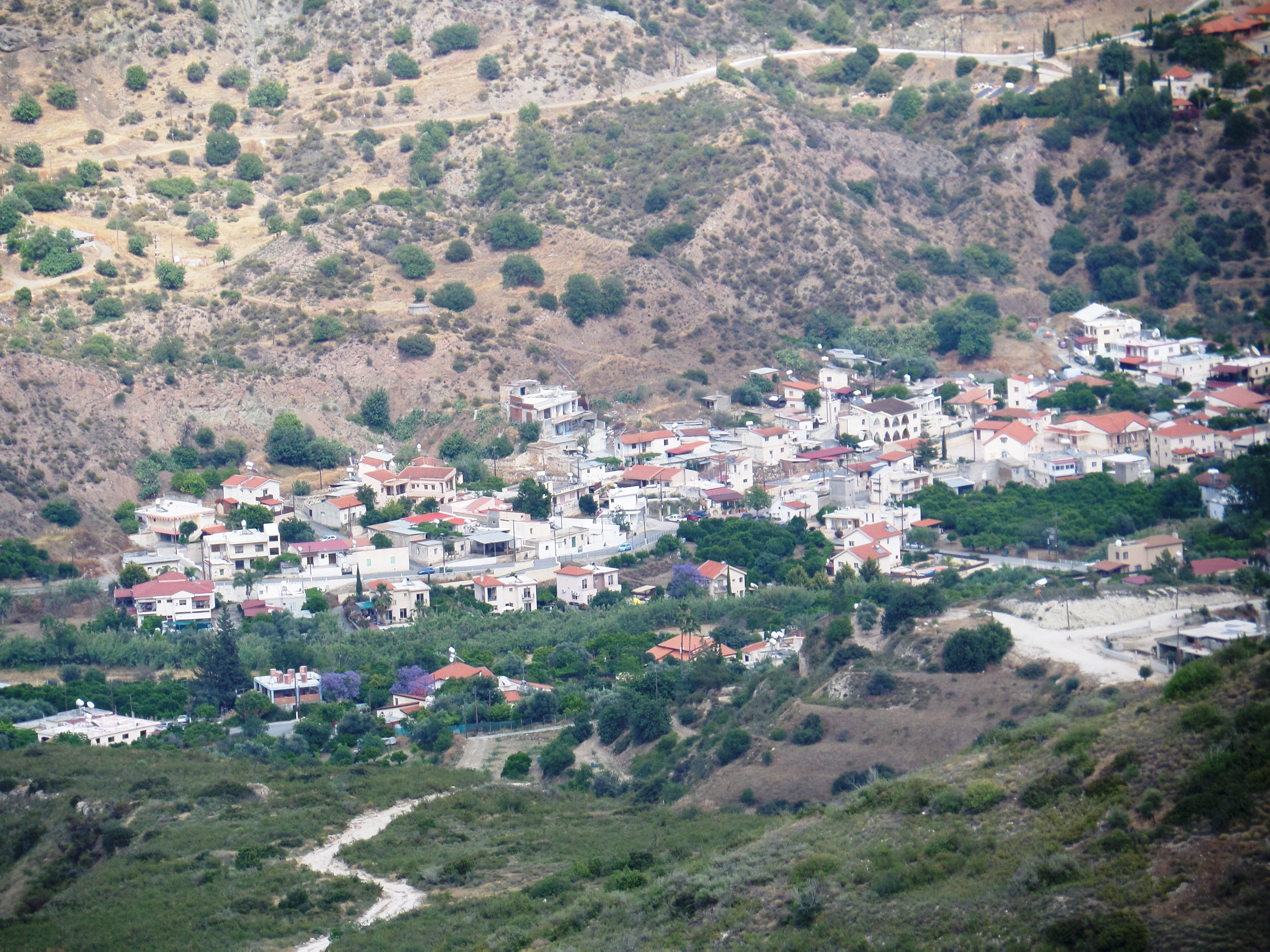

- Location in Cyprus
- Coordinates: 34°45′56″N 33°04′52″E
- Country: Cyprus
- District: Limassol District
- Municipality: Amathounta Municipality

Government
  - Deputy Mayor: Nicos Nicolaides

Population (2021)
  - Total: 521
- Time zone: UTC+2 (EET)
  - Summer (DST): UTC+3 (EEST)
- Website: eakrounta.org

Akrounta (Greek: Ακρούντα) is a village and a municipal district of the Amathounta Municipality in the Limassol District of Cyprus, located 5 km north of Germasogeia. Its current Deputy Mayor is Nicos Nicolaides.

== Etymology ==
The name of the village derives from the word akron (“edge”) and denotes a settlement built at the edge of a valley, as is the case with Akrounda. According to folklorist Nearchos Clerides (Νέαρχος Κληρίδης), Akrounda is among the ancient names of Cypriot villages.

== History ==
According to Medieval accounts (dated between 1236 and 1247), Venetian landowners seized properties in Akrounda. Additional references from the Ottoman occupation indicate that the village was a community of Linobambaki, Christians who converted to Islam to escape persecution.

There are also references to the village in connection with financial contributions made to support Greece during the Greco-Turkish War of 1897 and the Balkan Wars. In addition, the village is mentioned as having voted in favor of the union of Cyprus with Greece in the 1921 and 1930 plebiscites.

Until 1970, the residents' main occupations were agriculture and livestock farming. In 1968, the Germasogeia Dam was constructed, enabling the irrigation of hundreds of skales of land and leading to the development of irrigated crops. In addition, a new road network was built to serve the newly irrigated plots. These developments brought about the socio-economic growth of the village and contributed to an increase in its population.

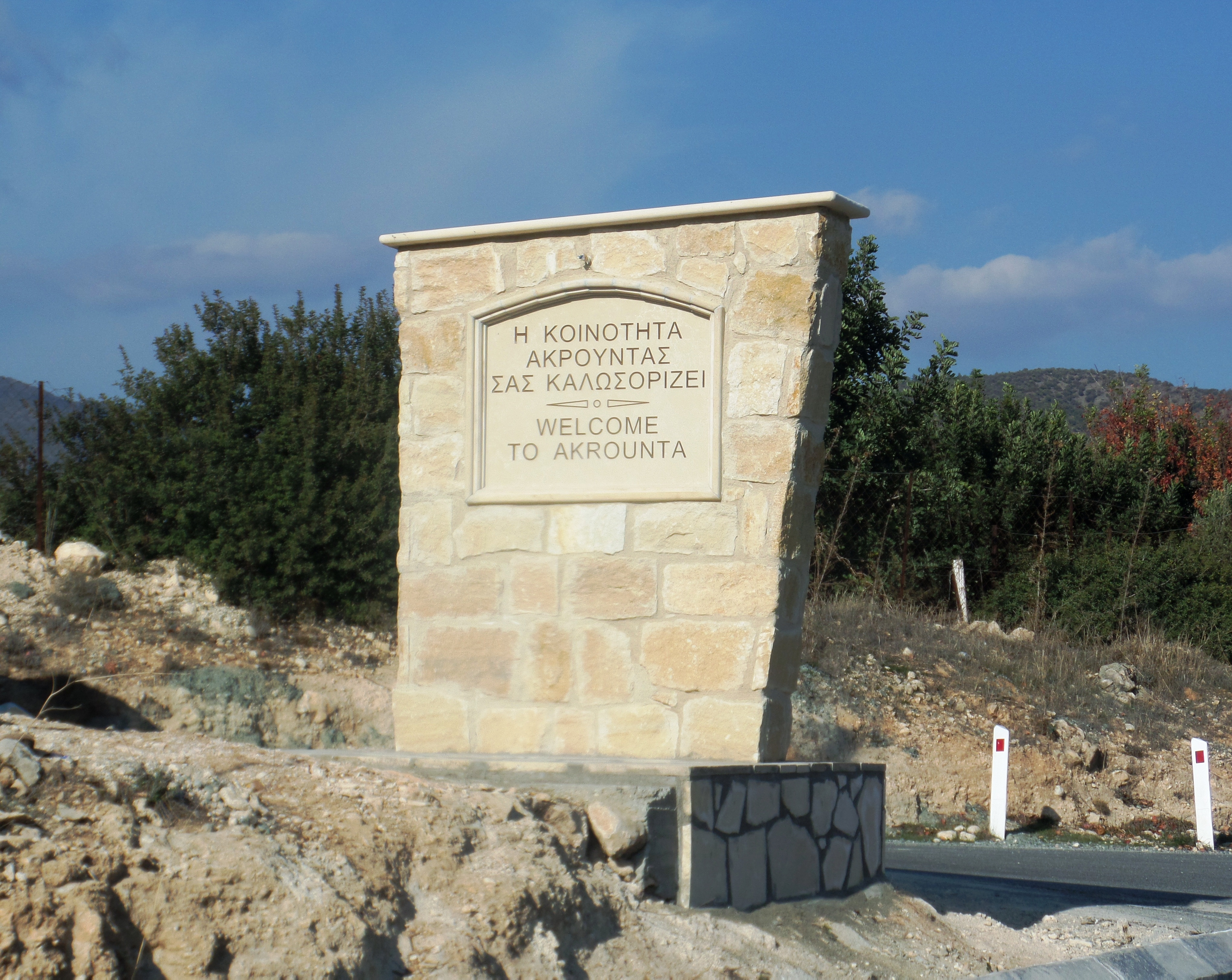
