= Mouttagiaka =

Moutagiaka Μουτταγιάκα
- Village and Municipal District
- Location in Cyprus
- Coordinates: 34°43′18″N 33°6′9″E
- Country: Cyprus
- District: Limassol District
- Municipality: Amathounta Municipality

Government
  - Deputy Mayor: Neofytos Pafitis

Population (2021)
  - Total: 3,239
- Time zone: UTC+2 (EET)
  - Summer (DST): UTC+3 (EEST)
- Website: moutayiaka.com

Mouttagiaka (Greek: Μουτταγιάκα [locally [mutʰaˈʝakʰa]]; Turkish: Mutluyaka) is a village and a municipal district of the Amathounta Municipality in the Limassol District of Cyprus, located east of Germasogeia. It's incumbent Deputy Mayor is Neofytos Pafitis.

Prior to 1960, the village was almost exclusively inhabited by Turkish Cypriots.
