= Neo Chorio, Paphos =

Neo Chorio
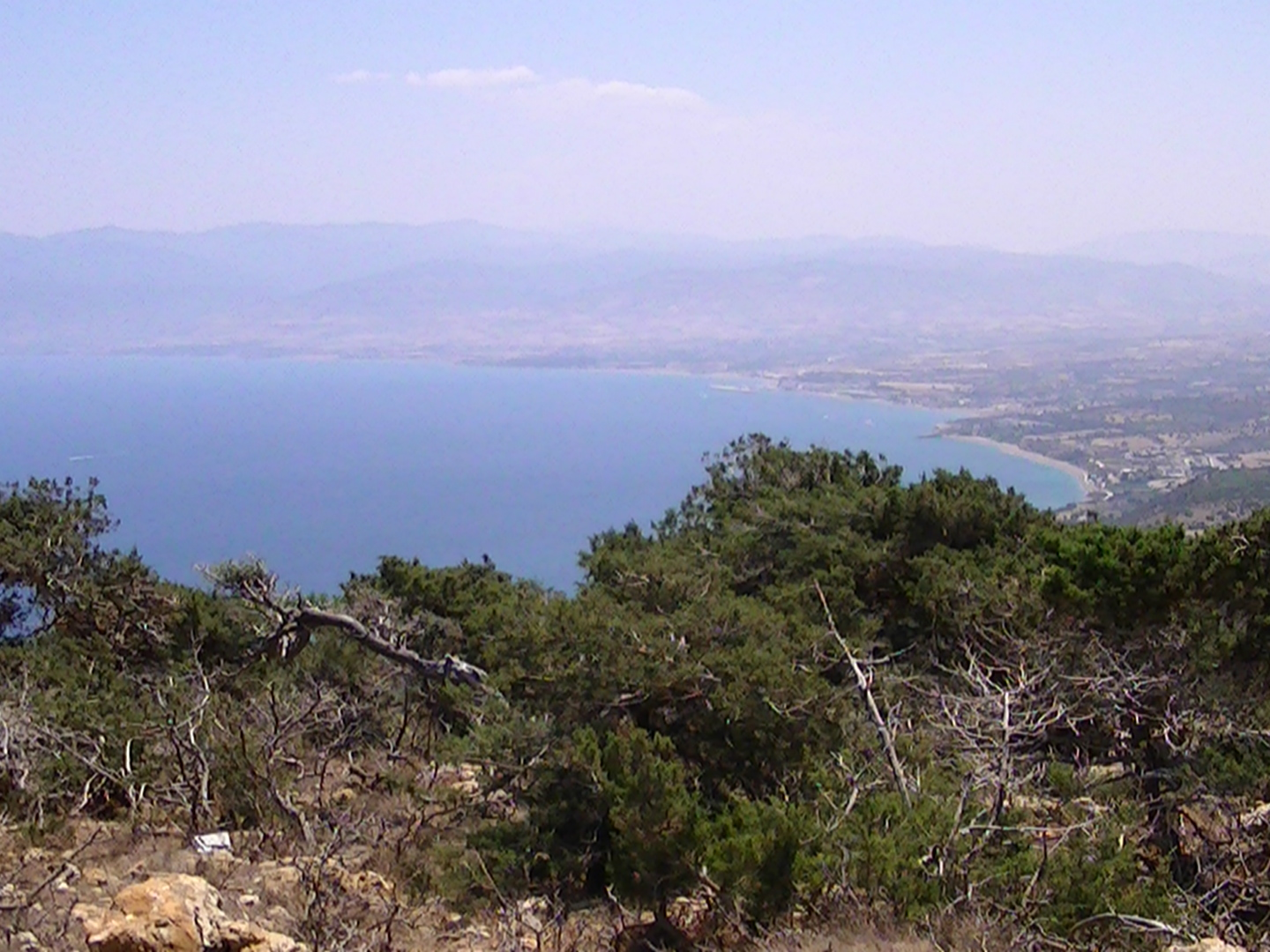

- Location within Cyprus
- Coordinates: 35°01′31″N 32°21′53″E
- Country: Cyprus
- District: Paphos District
- Elevation: 157 m (515 ft)

Population (2011)
  - Total: 519
- Website: www.neochorio.org

Neo Chorio (Greek: Νέο Χωριό, meaning New Village; Turkish: Neohoryo) is a village in the Paphos District of Cyprus, about 8 km west of Polis. Until 1958, it had a mixed Greek- and Turkish Cypriot population with a Greek Cypriot majority. Amid the intercommunal violence, the Turkish Cypriot inhabitants of Neo Chorio fled to Androlykou, a nearby Turkish Cypriot village. In 1975, following the Turkish invasion of the previous year and subsequent division of the island, most Turkish Cypriots of Neo Chorio resettled in Myrtou, now in Northern Cyprus. In 2011, Neo Chorio had a population of 519. Since July 1998, Neo Chorio has also been home to Anassa Hotel, a luxury 5* beach resort owned by the Thanos Hotels Group.

== Altitude ==
Built on the plateau of Laona, with an average altitude of about 170 meters, Neo Chorio Paphou is located in the Akamas peninsula, with a large part of the peninsula being under its administrative authority.

== Topography ==
A lot of streams flow from the ridge of the plateau – Mavri Sinia (at about 428 meters) - creating a verdant expanse of wildflowers, wild olive trees, wild carobs and pine trees that surround Neo Chorio Paphou. The settlement itself has views from above of the beaches of western Cyprus and the beaches of Polis Chrysochous bay. In the wider area, many of the 300 permanent residents of the village are engaged in the cultivation of citrus fruits, grains, fodder plants, almonds and walnuts, chickpeas, and produce their own wine. Others are livestock breeders and fishermen.

== Transportation ==
Access to Neo Chorio Paphou is easy via the port of Latchi (about 3 km to the southeast), although the main road that crosses the settlement passes through Akamas.
