= Mathikoloni =

Mathikoloni Μαθηκολώνη
- Village and Municipal District
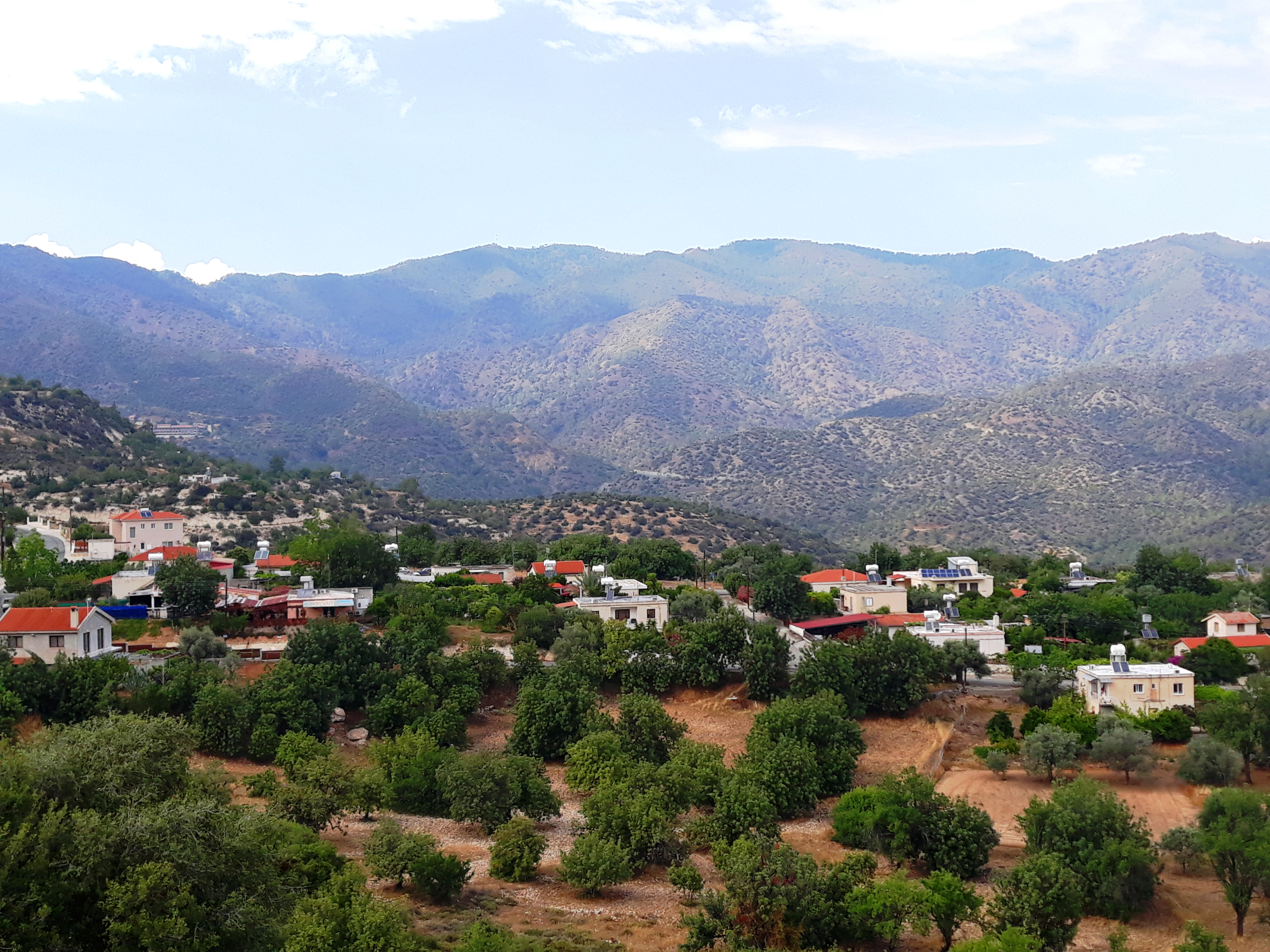
- View of Mathikoloni Village Limassol Cyprus

- Location in Cyprus
- Coordinates: 34°46′31″N 33°2′55″E
- Country: Cyprus
- District: Limassol District
- Municipality: Amathounta Municipality

Government
  - Deputy Mayor: Chrystalla Anaiti

Population (2021)
  - Total: 202
- Time zone: UTC+2 (EET)
  - Summer (DST): UTC+3 (EEST)

Mathikoloni (Greek: Μαθηκολώνη) is a village and a municipal district of the Amathounta Municipality in the Limassol District of Cyprus, located 10 km north of Limassol.

The current Deputy Mayor is Chrystalla Anaiti.

== Location ==
Mathikoloni is located at an altitude of 335 meters above sea level. It borders on the southwest with Agios Athanasios, on the west with Fasoula, on the north and northwest with Apsiou, on the northeast with Dierona, on the east with Akrounta and on the south with Germasogeia.

== History ==
The original location of the village was further west, but due to an earthquake the Cypriot government created a new settlement at its current location. The old settlement is abandoned. It became famous when he was used to shoot the BBC television series The Aphrodite Inheritance in 1979. Old Mathikoloni was included in the list of villages that belonged to the Great Commandaria. It first belonged to the Knights Templar and then to the Knights of St. John.

== Population ==
According to the population censuses carried out in Cyprus, the population of the village experienced several fluctuations. The last two censuses show an increase. The table below presents the population of Mathikoloni as recorded in the population censuses conducted in Cyprus.
