= Foinikaria =

Foinikaria Φοινικαριά
- Village and Municipal District
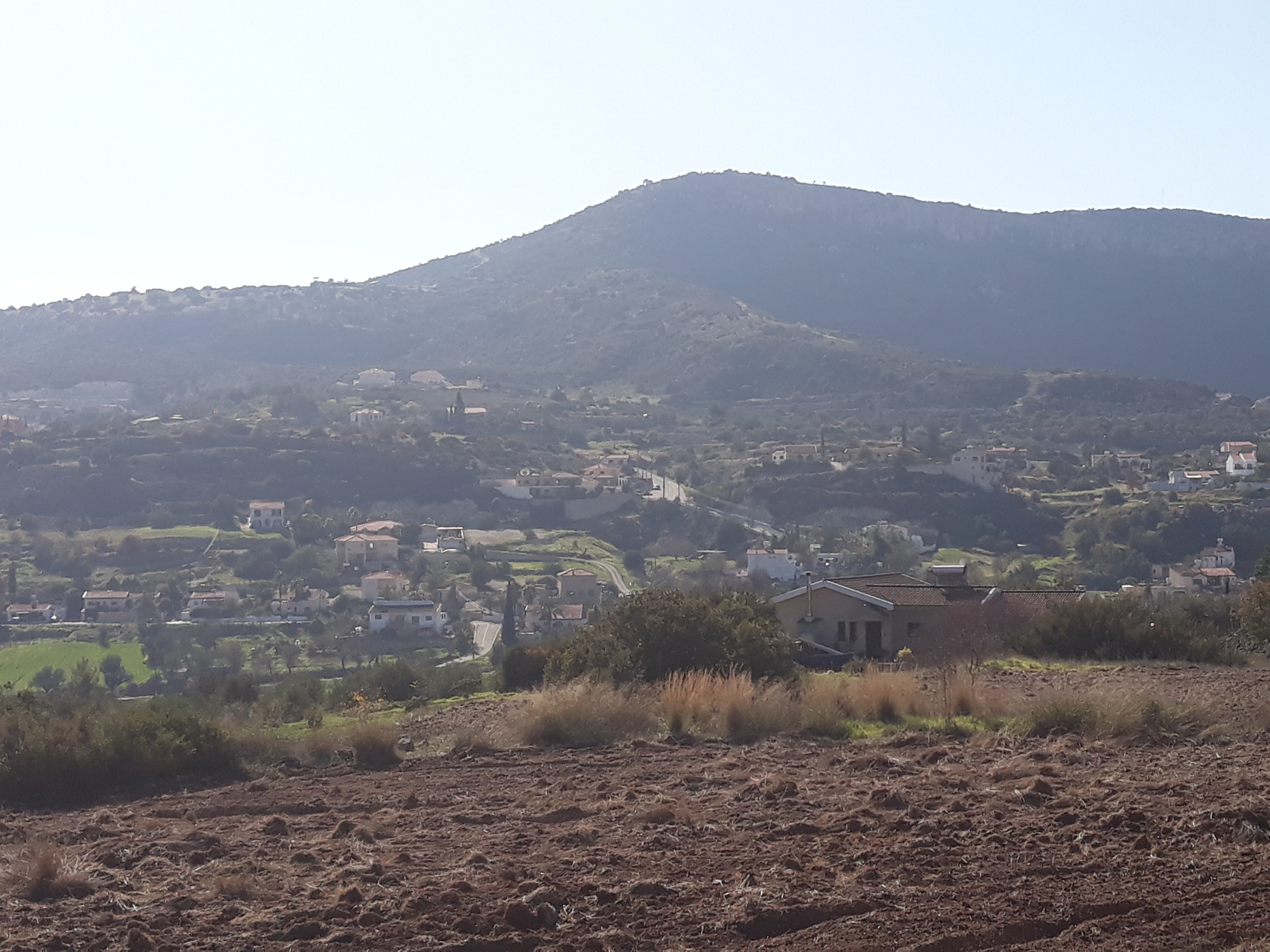

- Location in Cyprus
- Coordinates: 34°45′7″N 33°5′52″E
- Country: Cyprus
- District: Limassol District
- Municipality: Amathounta Municipality

Government
  - Deputy Mayor: Marios Rotis

Population (2021)
  - Total: 461
- Time zone: UTC+2 (EET)
  - Summer (DST): UTC+3 (EEST)

Foinikaria (Greek: Φοινικαριά) is a village and a municipal district of the Amathounta Municipality in the Limassol District of Cyprus, located east of the Germasogeia Dam. It is approximately a 7 kilometres (4 miles) drive from the Germasogeia roundabout, which is located on the Limassol – Nicosia and Limassol – Paphos Highway. It is a 10-minute drive to the sandy beach coast of the City of Limassol (180,000 population) and a 15-minute drive to the city center and surroundings where all amenities can be found.

== Nature, wildlife and outdoor activities ==
Foinikaria starts at an altitude of approximately 100 metres (330 feet) and as you drive north this altitude gradually increases to 600 metres (2,000 feet). The village is surrounded by rough terrain and mountains, which are suitable for photography, hiking, mountain climbing and mountain biking. The terrain hosts olive trees, pine trees, palm trees and cedar trees among others as well as various types of wild bushes, wild berries, mushrooms and wild flowers. Certain plantations are indigenous to the area. The terrain is also home to the Cyprus Falcon, hawks, eagles, venomous and non venomous snakes, squirrels and hedgehogs.

There is access to the river, which crosses more or less in between the village and eventually leads into the Germasogeia Dam. It is also suitable for fishing (you need a license to fish) throughout the year. Dragon Boat races, canoeing and Kayak sporting activities are also hosted there throughout the year. The river water is also used for agricultural purposes.

== History ==
Foinikaria has existed since the medieval times and possibly has its origins from the Byzantine period. The village has also been known as Phinica and Einicaria as was evident from maps from the Venetian period. There is evidence that suggest Foinikaria was also part of the ancient kingdom of Amathunda.

== Name ==
Many residents from older generations of the village claimed that the village‘s name derived from the ancient mythological bird Phoenix, who rose from flames and ashes just as the old village of Foinikaria did when it was completely burned and destroyed from the continuous raids and attacks from outsiders. Other residents claim that the name of the village derived from the word Palm Tree, which is Phoenikas (Φοίνικας) in Greek.

== Sites of interest ==
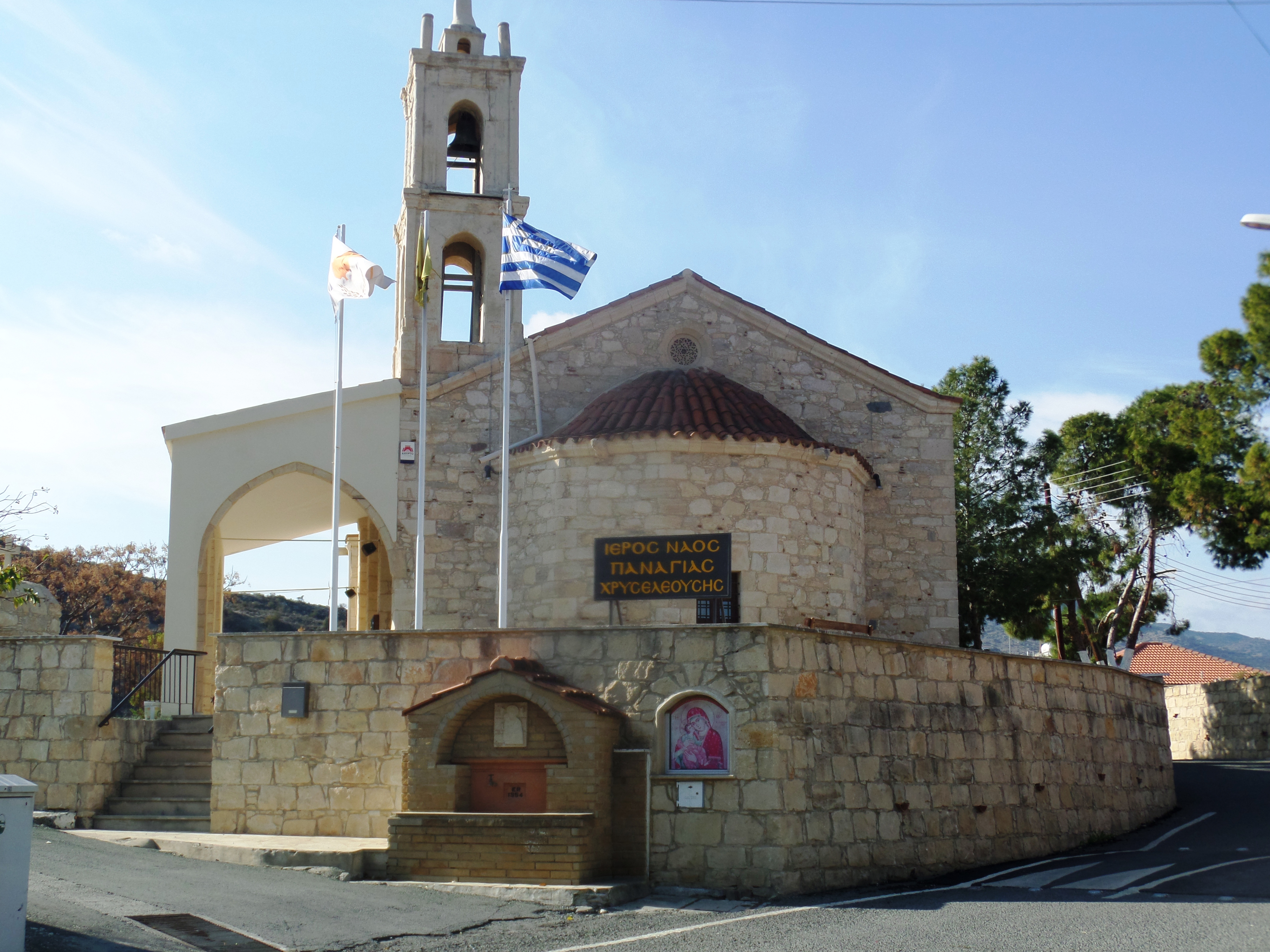

Sites of interest include the Greek Christian Orthodox Church of Virgin Mary Chryseleosis, nature trail paths, village cafeteria / restaurant with a children's playground, the community library, the rock with the holy water of Saint Lucas, off-road driving and motocross areas, etc.
