= 2024 Cypriot local elections =

Local government elections in Cyprus

The 2024 Cypriot local elections were held on 9 June 2024 concurrently with European elections to save money.

== Background ==
These elections had been postponed from December 2021 pending local government reform.

== Elections by place ==
- 2024 Limassol municipal election
