= Nicos Nicolaides (politician) =

Cypriot politician (born 1953)

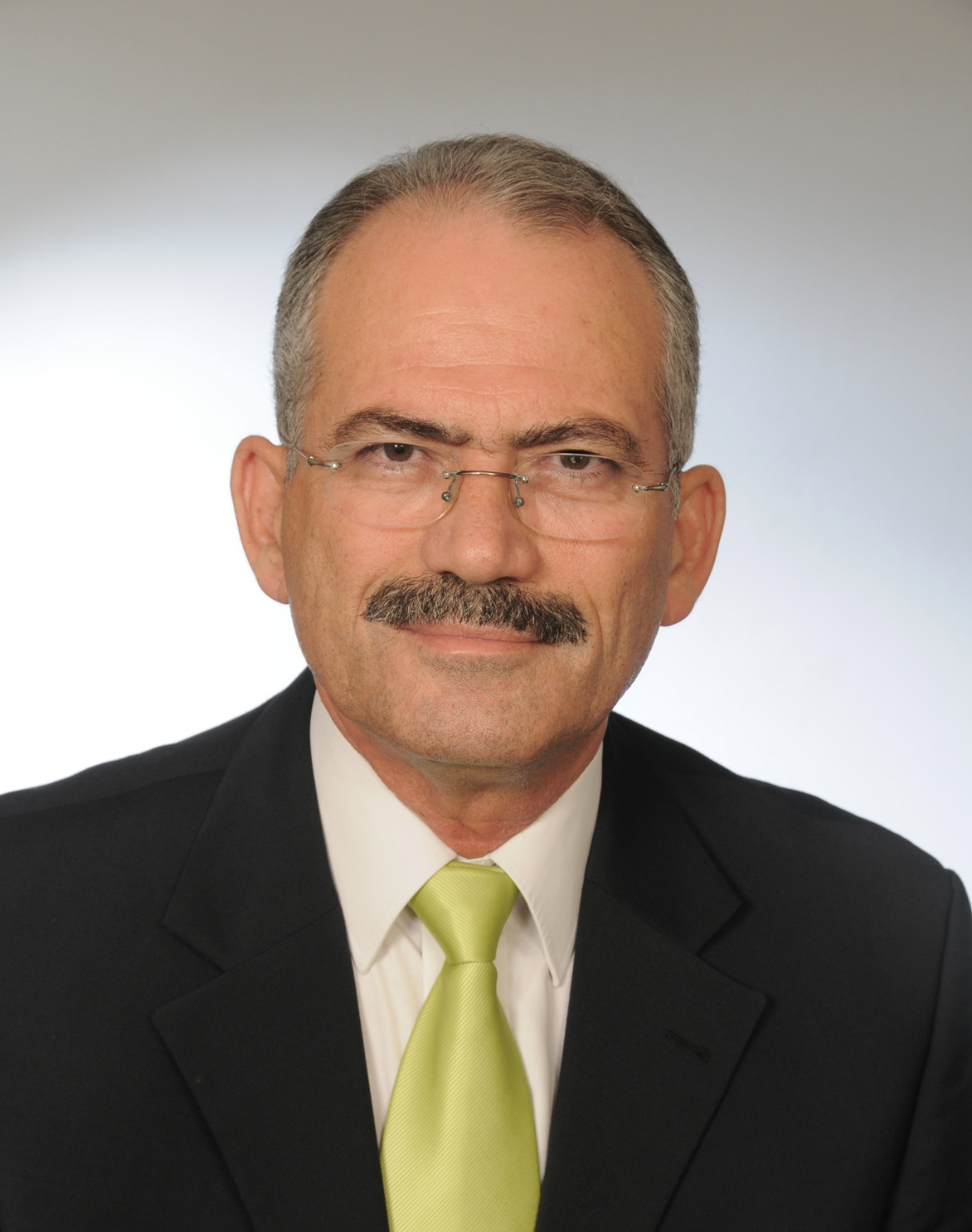

17th Mayor of Limassol
- In office 19 December 2016 – 1 July 2024
- Preceded by: Andreas Christou
- Succeeded by: Yiannis Armeftis

Member of the Cypriot Parliament for Limassol
- In office May 2011 – May 2016

Minister of Communications and Works
- In office 22 February 2008 – 9 February 2010
- President: Demetris Christofias
- Preceded by: Maria Malachtou-Pampalli
- Succeeded by: Erato Kozakou-Marcoullis

Personal details
- Born: 2 November 1953 (age 72) Limassol, Cyprus
- Party: EDEK (until 2016); Independent (2016-present)
- Education: University of Southern California
- Website: www.nnicolaides.com.cy

Nicos Nicolaides (Greek: Νίκος Νικολαΐδης; born 2 November 1953) is a Greek Cypriot politician. He served as the Mayor of Limassol from December 2016 to July 2024. From May 2011 to December 2016, he was a Member of Parliament in the House of Representatives of Cyprus, representing the Limassol constituency under the banner of social democratic party EDEK.

He currently serves as the Deputy Mayor of Akrounta, elected following the 2024 Municipal Elections.

== Personal life ==
Nicolaides was born in Limassol in 1953. He studied electrical engineering at Dartmouth College and the University of Southern California, earning a master's degree.

Nicolaides is married to Elena Ioannou and has two children and a grandson. He speaks English and French fluently.

== Political career ==
Nicolaides was Minister of Communications and Works in the Christofias cabinet between 2008 and 2010. Previously, he served as chairman of the board of the Licensing Authority (2006–2008), as president of the EDEK Limassol District committee (2003–2008) and as a member of the EDEK political bureau and central committee.

In parliament, Nicolaides served as a member of the Agriculture and Natural Resources, Communications and Works, Finance and Budget, and Legal Affairs committees.

Nicolaides was elected as the Mayor of Limassol in December 2016. He ran as an independent candidate, supported by the ruling DISY, the Green party, the Solidarity Movement and Limassol Architects Movement. Nicolaides won the mayoral election with 48.31% of the vote, narrowly defeating two-term incumbent Andreas Christou, who received 48.27%, by a margin of just 9 votes.

In the municipal election of June 9, 2024, he ran independently for a second term, supported by DISY and DIPA. He finished second with 43% of the votes, behind Yiannis Armeftis who received 48%, and ahead of Christos Michaelides who received 8%.
