= Andreas Christou =

Cypriot politician (born 1948)

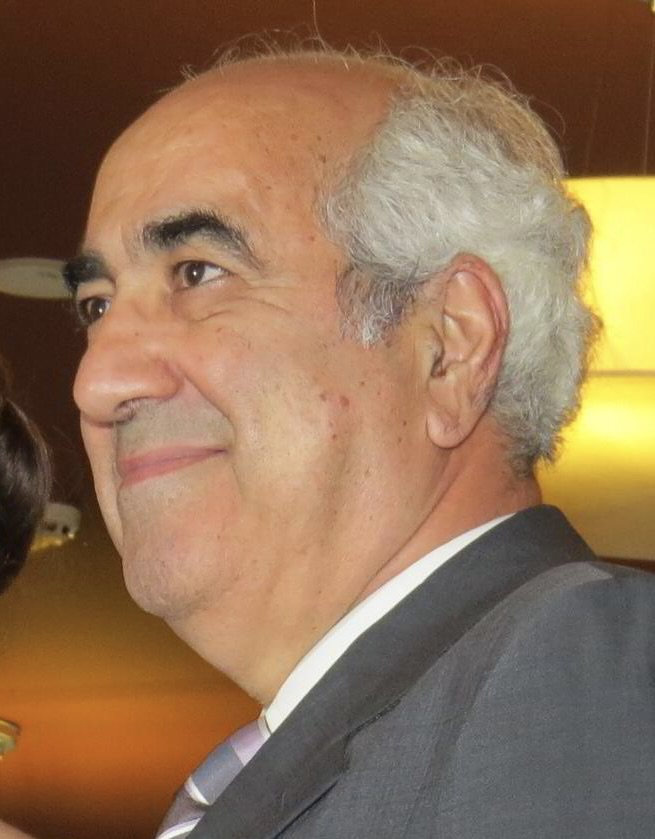

16th Mayor of Limassol
- In office December 2006 – December 2016
- Preceded by: Demetris Kontidis
- Succeeded by: Nicos Nicolaides

Minister of Interior
- In office 1 March 2003 – 7 September 2006

Member of Parliament
- In office 1996–2006

Personal details
- Born: 1948 (age 77–78) Limassol, Cuyprus
- Spouse: Kristian Argyridou

Andreas Christou is a Cypriot engineer and politician who served as a member of parliament for the Progressive Party of Working People (AKEL). He served as Minister of the Interior from 2003 to 2006.

== Early life ==
Christou was born in Limassol in 1948. He graduated from Laniteion Gymnasium. He studied mechanical engineering in Moscow and was actively involved in the Cypriot Students and Youth Movement. He worked as a mechanical engineer and later on as a senior manager of a Limassol-based Industrial Corporation.

== Political career ==
In the first Municipal Elections, held in 1986, he was elected as a Municipal Councilor. He was also a member of the Sewerage Board of Limassol-Amathus and the Water Board of Limassol.

In 1991, Christou was elected as a Member of Parliament for AKEL, representing the District of Limassol three times. During his term as an MP, he served as Chairman of the Parliamentary Committee on Institutions and Merit, Chairman of the Parliamentary Subcommittee on Temporary Civil Servants and a member of the Parliamentary Committee on Foreign and European Affairs. From 1991 to 2003, he was a Parliamentary Leader and a member of the National Council.

In March 2003, Christou was appointed Minister of the Interior, remaining in the position until September 2006.

In December 2006, Christou was elected Mayor of Limassol. He was re-elected for a second term in the 2011 mayoral election, receiving 57% of the vote.

Christou was involved in the social and cultural life of Limassol as a member of various committees and institutions, as well as participating in glee clubs as a guitar player and serenade singer.

== Personal ==
Christou married Kristian Argyridou and has a son and a grandson.
