= Armenochori, Cyprus =

Armenochori Greek: Αρμενοχώρι; Turkish: Esenköy; Armenian: Արմենոխորի
- Village and Municipal District
- Location in Cyprus
- Coordinates: 34°44′40″N 33°7′45″E
- Country: Cyprus
- District: Limassol District
- Municipality: Amathounta Municipality

Government
  - Deputy Mayor: Christos Champou

Area
  - Total: 3,164 sq mi (8,195 km^{2})

Population (2021)
  - Total: 211
- Time zone: UTC+2 (EET)
  - Summer (DST): UTC+3 (EEST)
- Postcode: 4523
- Area code: 5121

Armenochori (Greek: Αρμενοχώρι; Turkish: Esenköy; Armenian: Արմենոխորի) is an Armenian village and a municipal district of the Amathounta Municipality located in the Limassol District of Cyprus, 10 kilometres (6 miles) northeast of the city of Limassol. Armenochori means “Armenian village” in Greek. In 1958, the Turkish Cypriots adopted the alternative name Esenköy, literally meaning “windy village.”

== History ==
=== Ancient ===
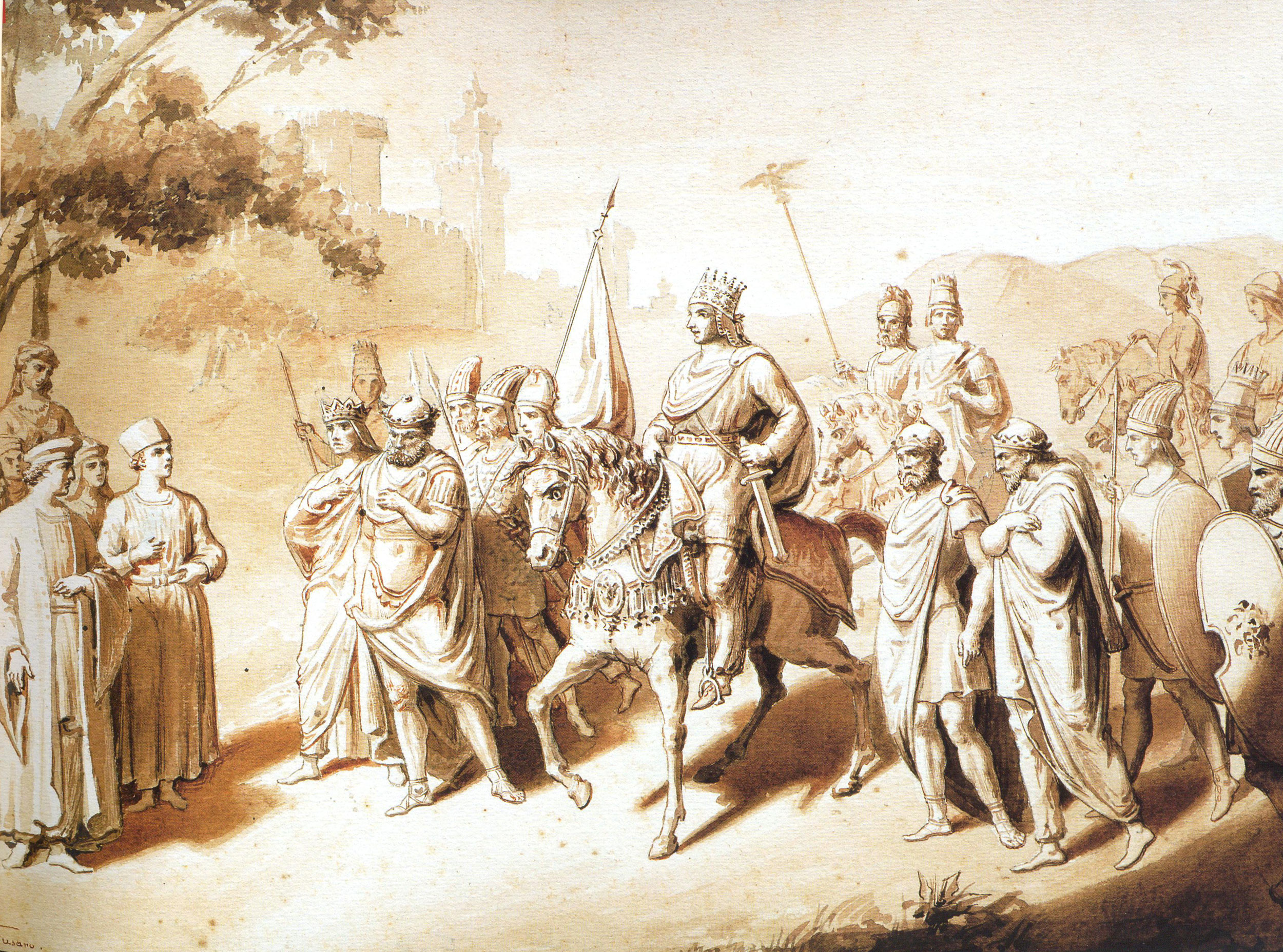
Tigranes the Great with four Kings surrounding him

Armenochori is one of the oldest villages of Limassol District. Early signs of inhabitation are known to be dated to 85BC, when the emperor of Armenia named Tigranes the Great, son of Khoren the Great III, (Armenian: Տիգրան Մեծ Tigran Mets; Greek: Τιγράνης ὁ Μέγας Tigránes o Mégas) had conquered Syria, Lebanon, parts of Israel, Anatolia and Cyprus. Part of Tigranes' army remained in Cyprus in order to guarantee the security of the Greek population of the island against aggressive Arabians. After continuing his achievements throughout the middle east, Tigran orders some of his leading military personnel to stay behind in the areas of modern Armenochori to monitor developments of agreements of protection of local Greek allies. The area of Armenochori was strategically convenient to watch over the Mediterranean horizon and sound alarm against possible invasions by enemies.

Ancient history says:

Tigranes, to whom Lucullus had sent an ambassador, though of no great power in the beginning of his reign, had enlarged it so much by a series of successes, of which there are few examples, that he was commonly surnamed "King of Kings." After having overthrown and almost ruined the family of the kings, successors of the great Seleucus; after having very often humbled the pride of the Parthians, transported whole cities of Greeks into Media, conquered all Syria and Palestine, and given laws to the Arabians called Scenites, he reigned with an authority respected by all the princes of Asia. The people paid him honors after the manners of the East, even to adoration.

=== Ottoman Period ===
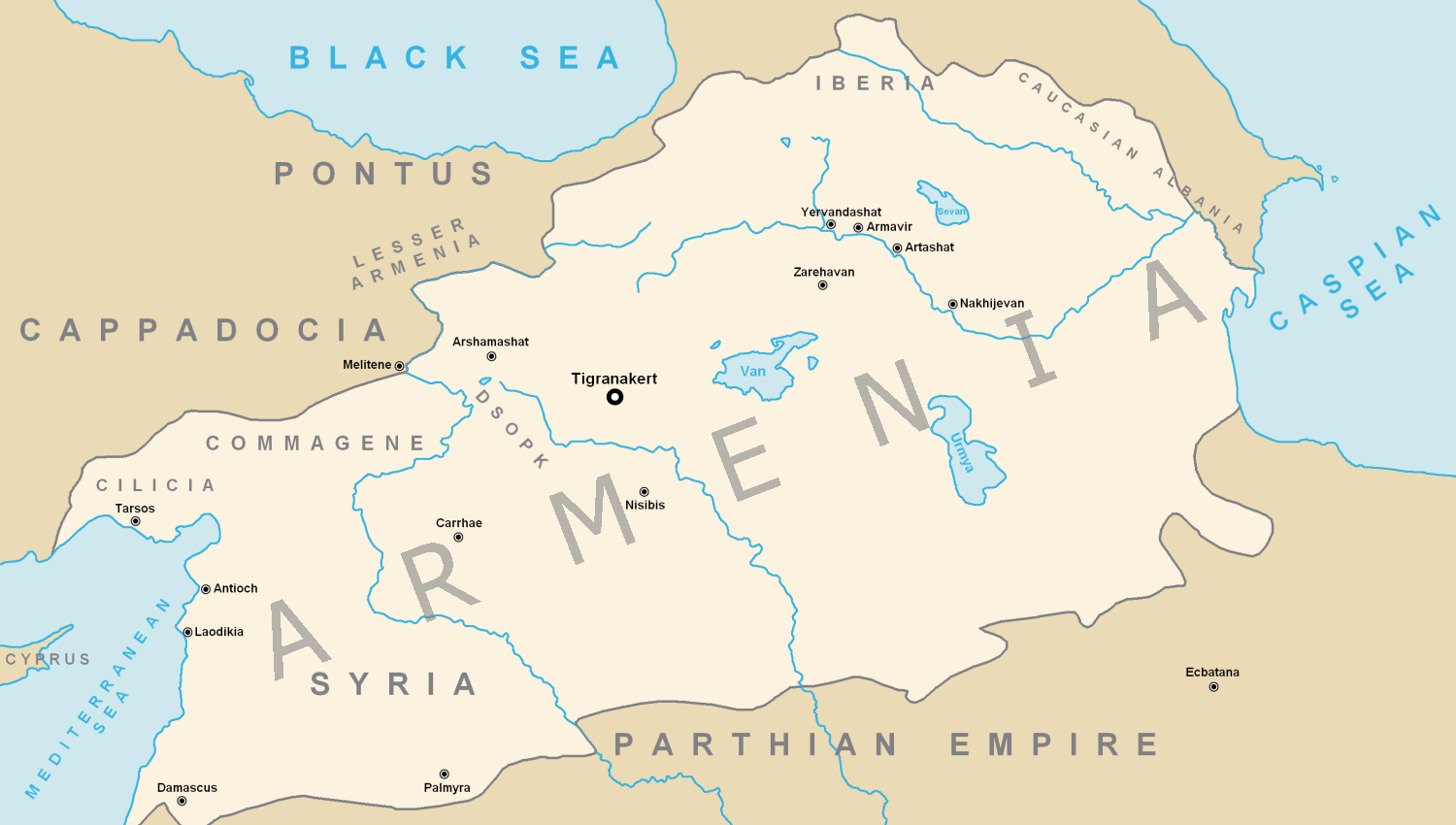
The Kingdom of Armenia at its greatest extent under Tigranes the Great

Armenochori/Esenköy was turned into a Turkish Cypriot village during the Ottoman period. Although some Greek Cypriot and Armenian families lived there between 1891 and 1931, almost all of them left the village by the 1940s. Over the course of the British period, the population of the village doubled, rising from 89 persons in 1891 to 162 in 1960.

=== Modern ===
Today the village is the choice of residence of wealthy businessmen from Cyprus, Russia, Armenia and other countries. It has a population of 187 people.
