= Tserkezoi =

- Location in Cyprus
- Coordinates: 34°39′9″N 32°59′20″E
- Country: Cyprus
- District: Limassol District

Population (2011)
  - Total: 50
- Time zone: UTC+2 (EET)
  - Summer (DST): UTC+3 (EEST)

Tserkezoi (Greek: Τσερκέζοι or Τσερκέζ Τσιφλίκ; Turkish: Çerkez or Çerkez Çiftliği) is a village west of Limassol, Cyprus, lying partly in Limassol District, and partly in the British Overseas Territory of Akrotiri and Dhekelia.

Tserkezoi is the Greek name of the Circassians who inhabited Cyprus in the late 19th century.

There is another article in wikipedia about the same topic

Cerkez Ciflik (or Tzerkezoi-How local Greek-Cypriots call the area inhabitants- or Circassians) is a community in the province of Limassol in Cyprus.

== Location ==
Cerkez Ciftlik is located next to the city of Limassol. It borders on the east with the municipality of Limassol (with the settlement of Zakaki to the northeast with Kato Polemidia, to the north with Ypsonas, to the west with Trachoni and to the southwest with Asomatos. A large part of the beach of Aplostra (Lady's Mile) belongs administratively to Cerkez Tsiflik. In addition, much of the community's administrative area falls within the territory of the British Akrotiri Military Base.
