= Timi =

Timi Τίμη
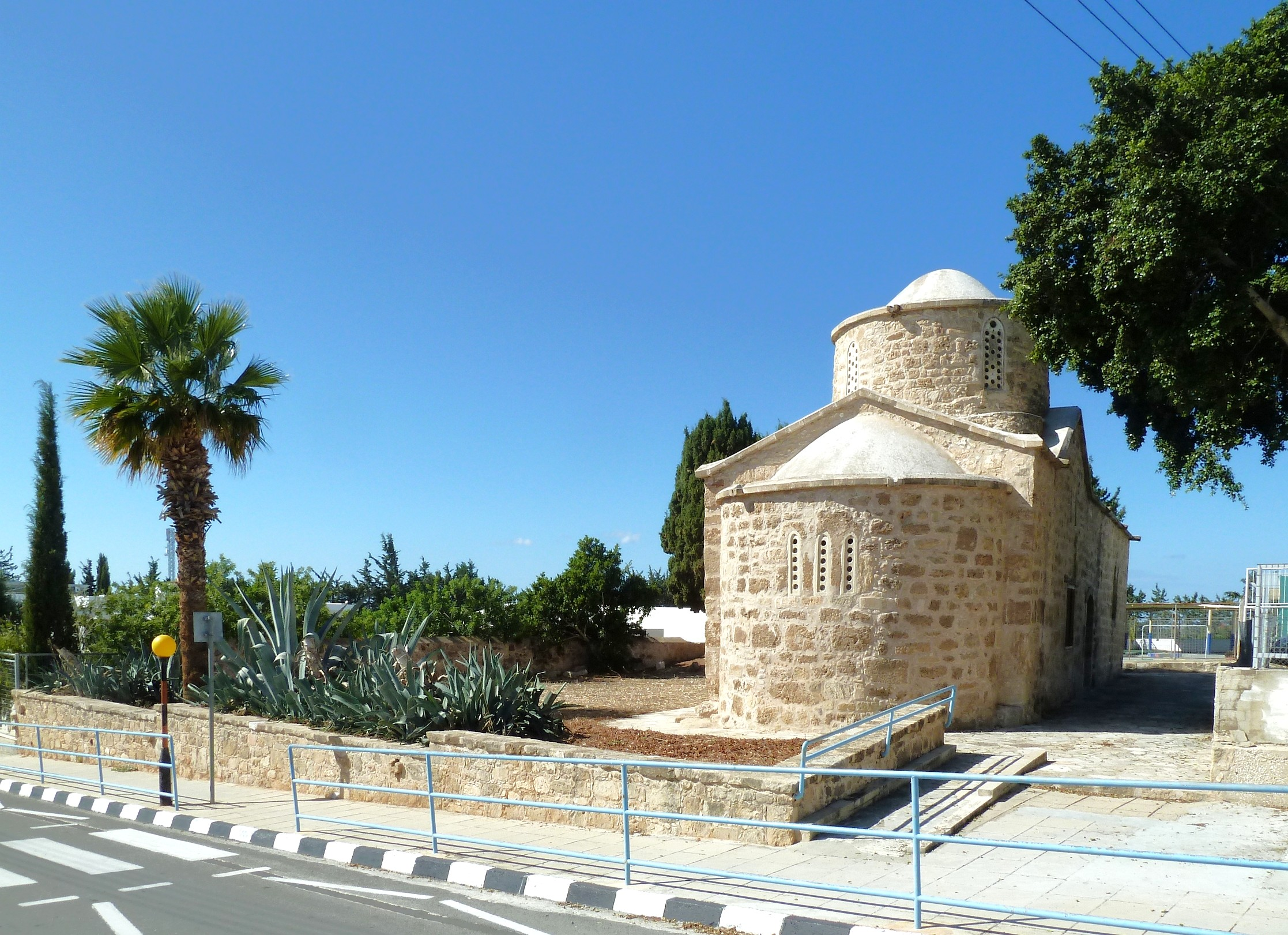
- Church of Agia Sofia

- Location in Cyprus
- Coordinates: 34°43′56″N 32°30′55″E
- Country: Cyprus
- District: Paphos District

Population (2001)
  - Total: 899
- Time zone: UTC+2 (EET)
  - Summer (DST): UTC+3 (EEST)
- Postal code: 6104

Timi (Greek: Τίμη) is a village in the Paphos District of Cyprus, located 8 km east of Paphos.
