= Germasogeia =

Germasogeia Γερμασόγεια (Greek)
- Municipal District
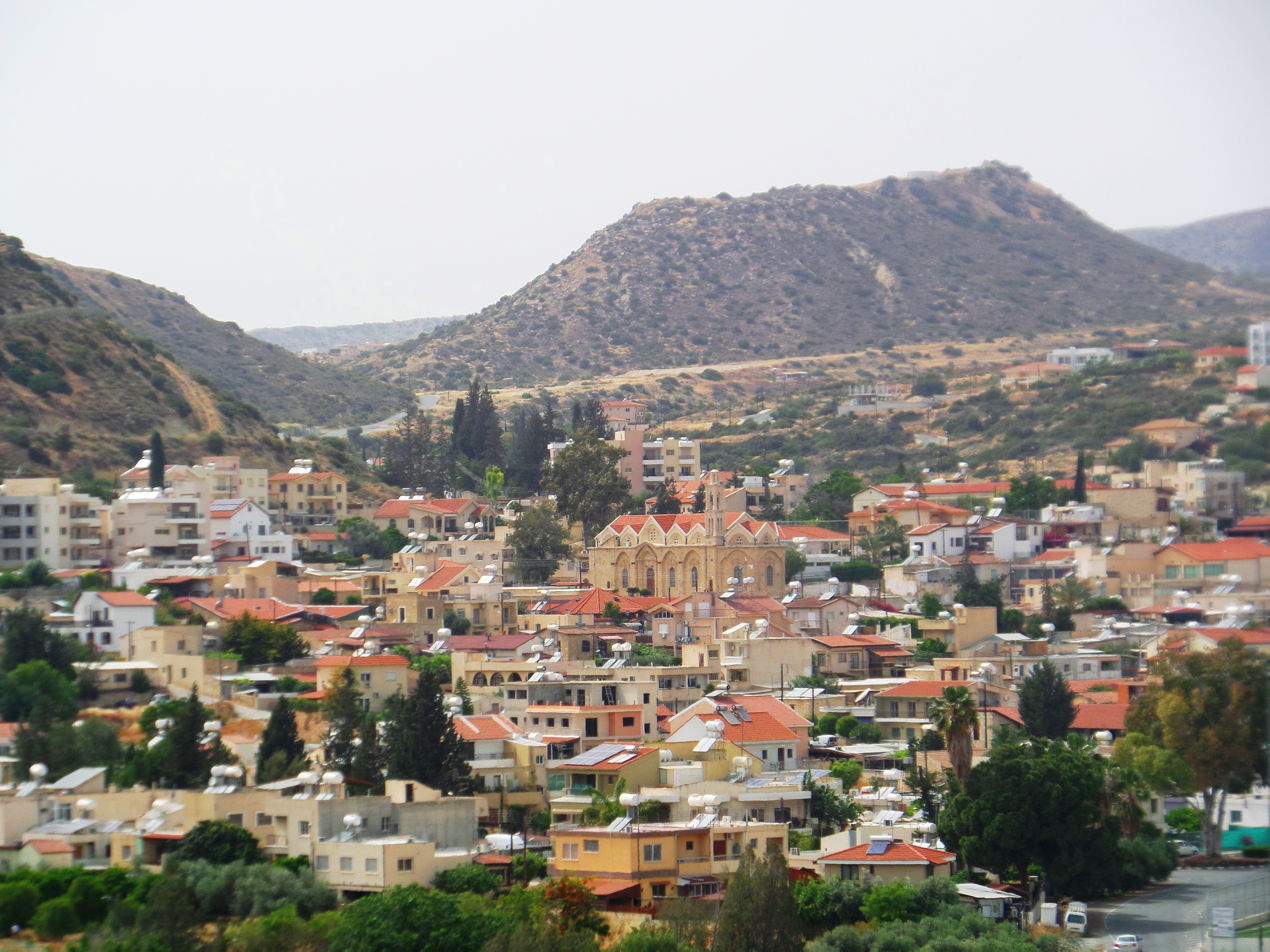
- View of Germasogeia

- Seal
- Interactive map of Germasogeia
- Location within Cyprus Location within the Eastern Mediterranean Location within the European Union Location within Asia
- Coordinates: 34°43′5″N 33°5′8″E
- Country: Cyprus
- District: Limassol District
- Urban area: Limassol

Government
  - Deputy Mayor: Christos Papamichail

Area
  - Municipal District: 15.73 km^{2} (6.07 sq mi)

Population (2021)
  - Municipal District: 17,325
  - Density: 1,101/km^{2} (2,853/sq mi)
- Website: Yermasoyia Municipality

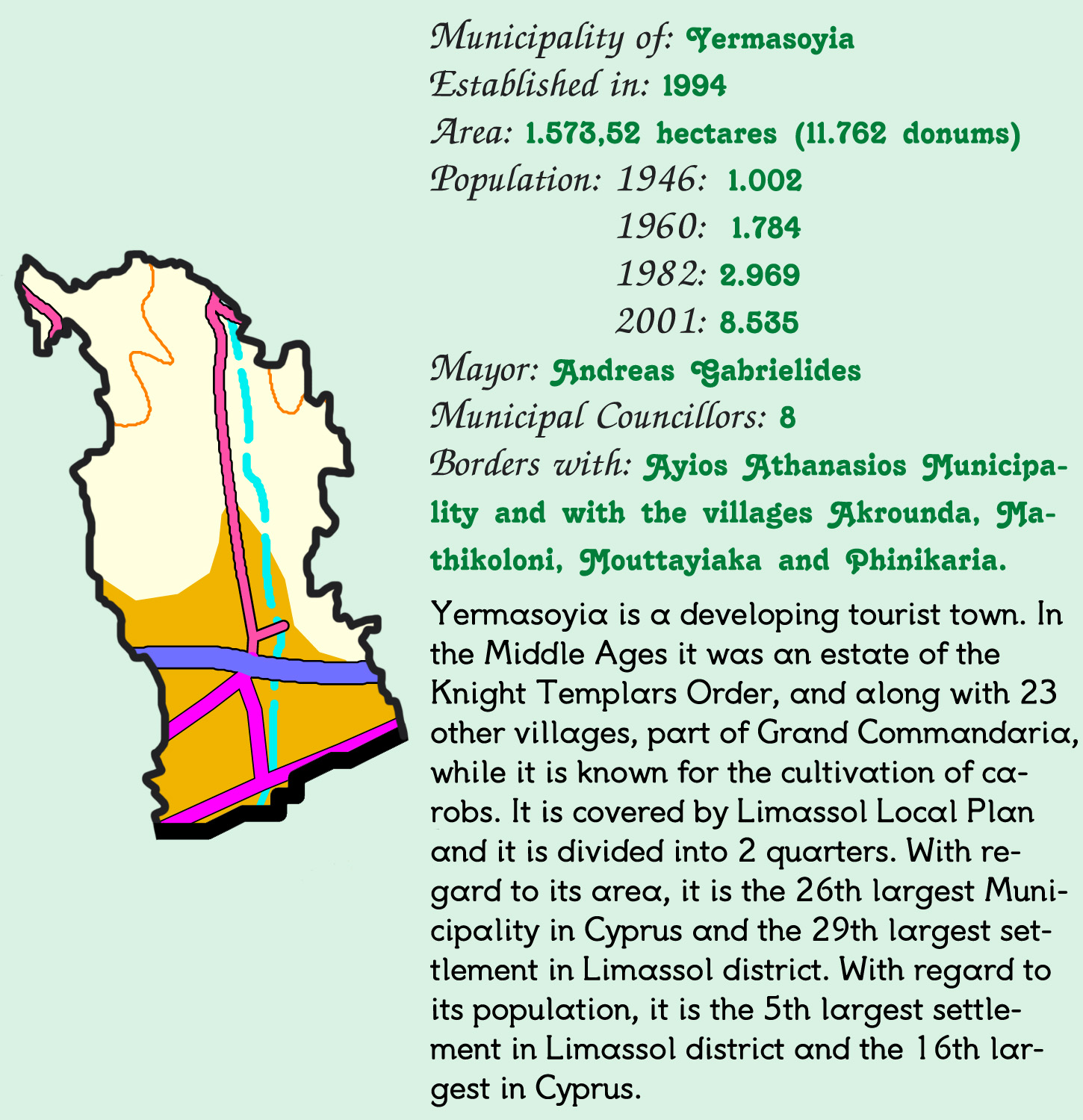
Concise presentation of Germasogeia.

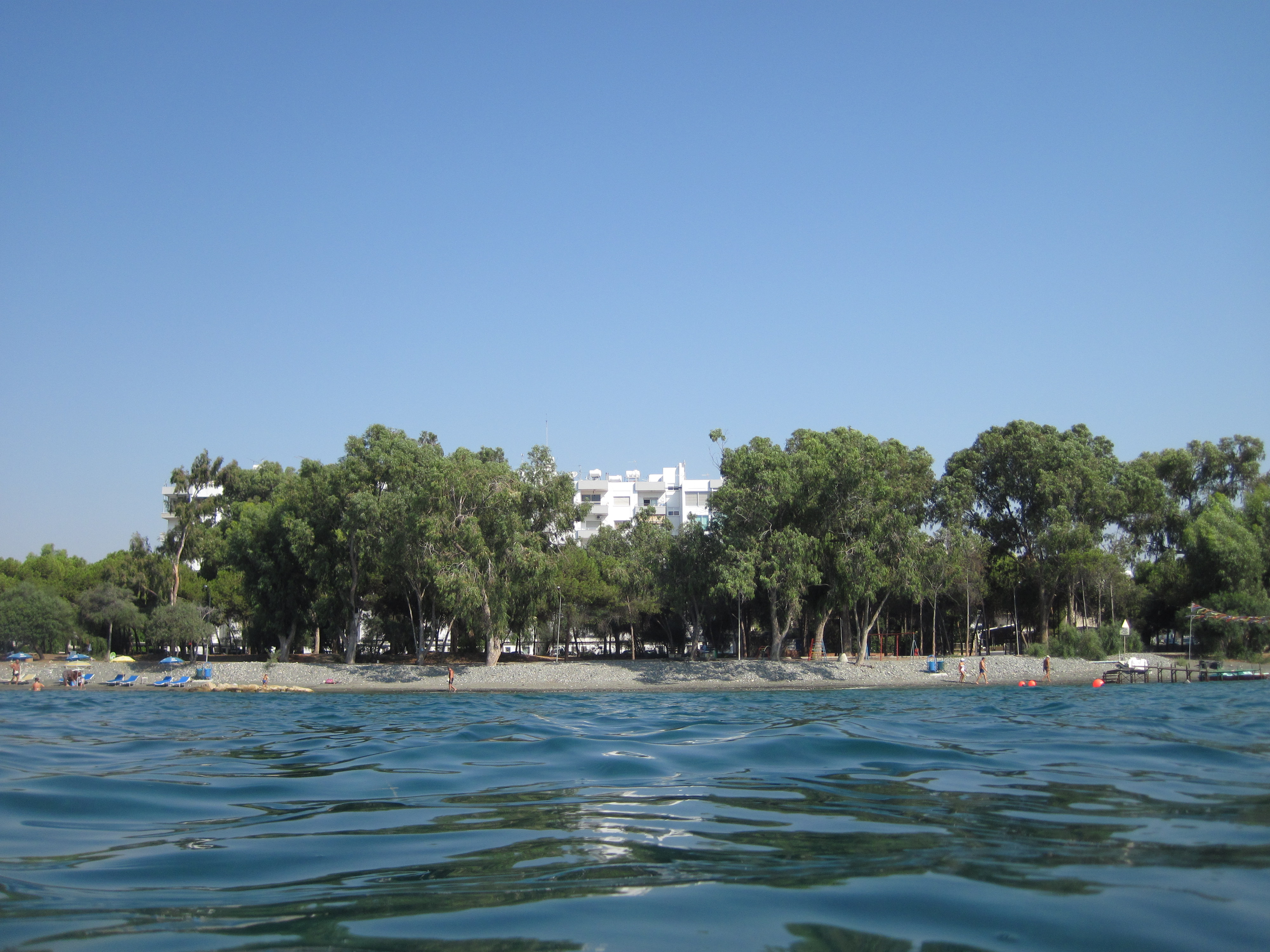
Germasogeia Beach in 2009, with the trees of "Dasoudi" ("Little Forest" in Cypriot Greek) visible.

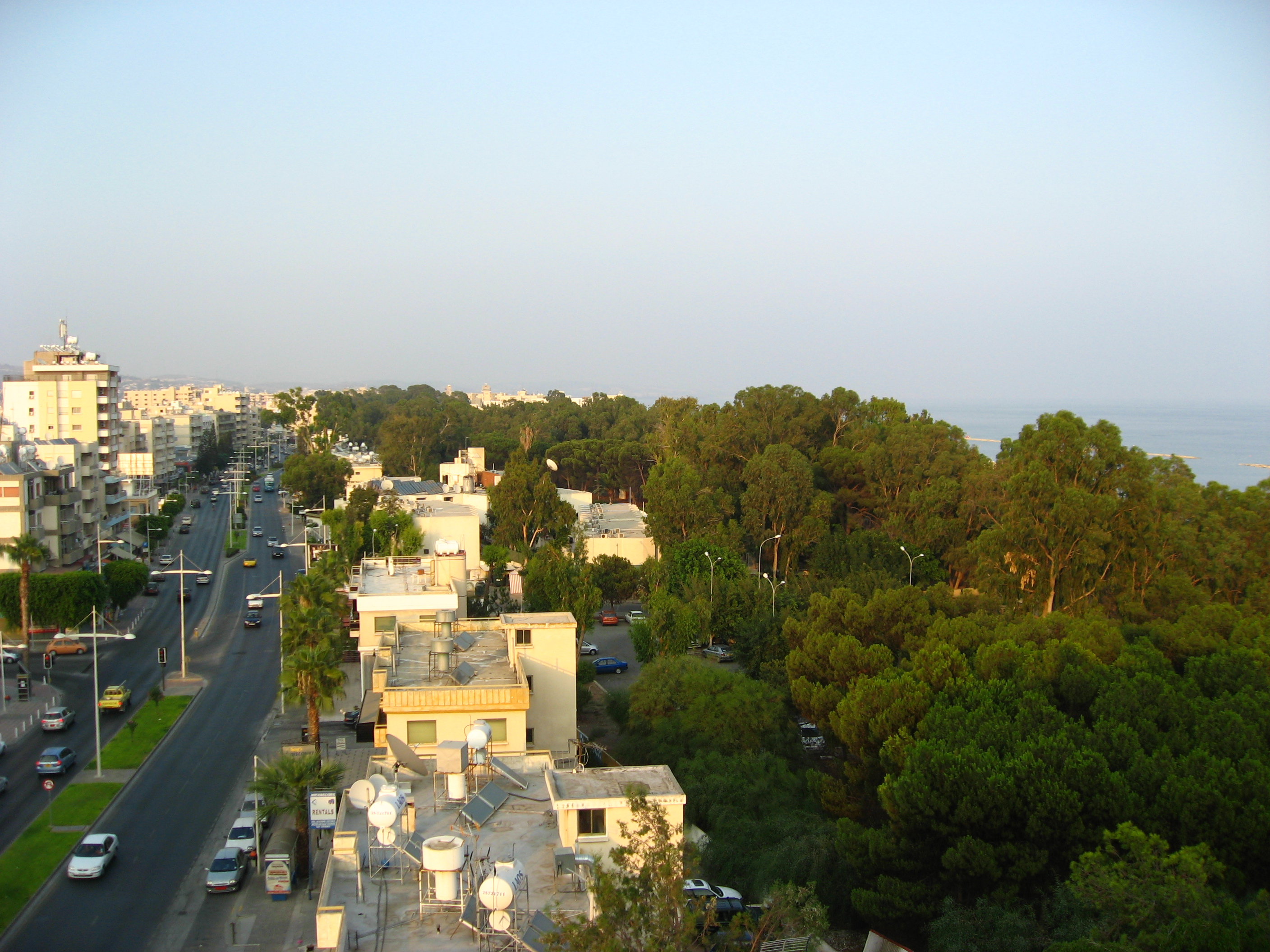
Germasogeia in 2006, looking towards the east.

Germasogeia (Greek: Γερμασόγεια), is an eastern suburb of Limassol and a municipal district of the Amathounta Municipality in the Limassol District of Cyprus. As of 2021, Germasogeia had a population of 17,325. Its mayor, Kyriakos Xidias, won the local elections on 18 December 2016 as an independent candidate. During the elections, Xidias prevailed with 26.73% of the vote against 23.01% of two-term incumbent Andreas Gavrielides.

The small town was fortified in the medieval period by the Knights Templar. Germasogeia dam was built there in 1968.

== Etymology ==
The name Germasogeia derives from the words hieros ("sacred") and mesogeia ("midlands" or "inland"). The term hieros refers to the many temples that once existed in the area, while mesogeia reflects the settlement's relatively close proximity to the sea.

== International relations ==
=== Twin towns — sister cities ===
Germasogeia is twinned with:

- Stari Grad, Serbia
- Litochoro, Greece
