= Laona villages =

Laona Region Περιοχή Λαόνα
- Region
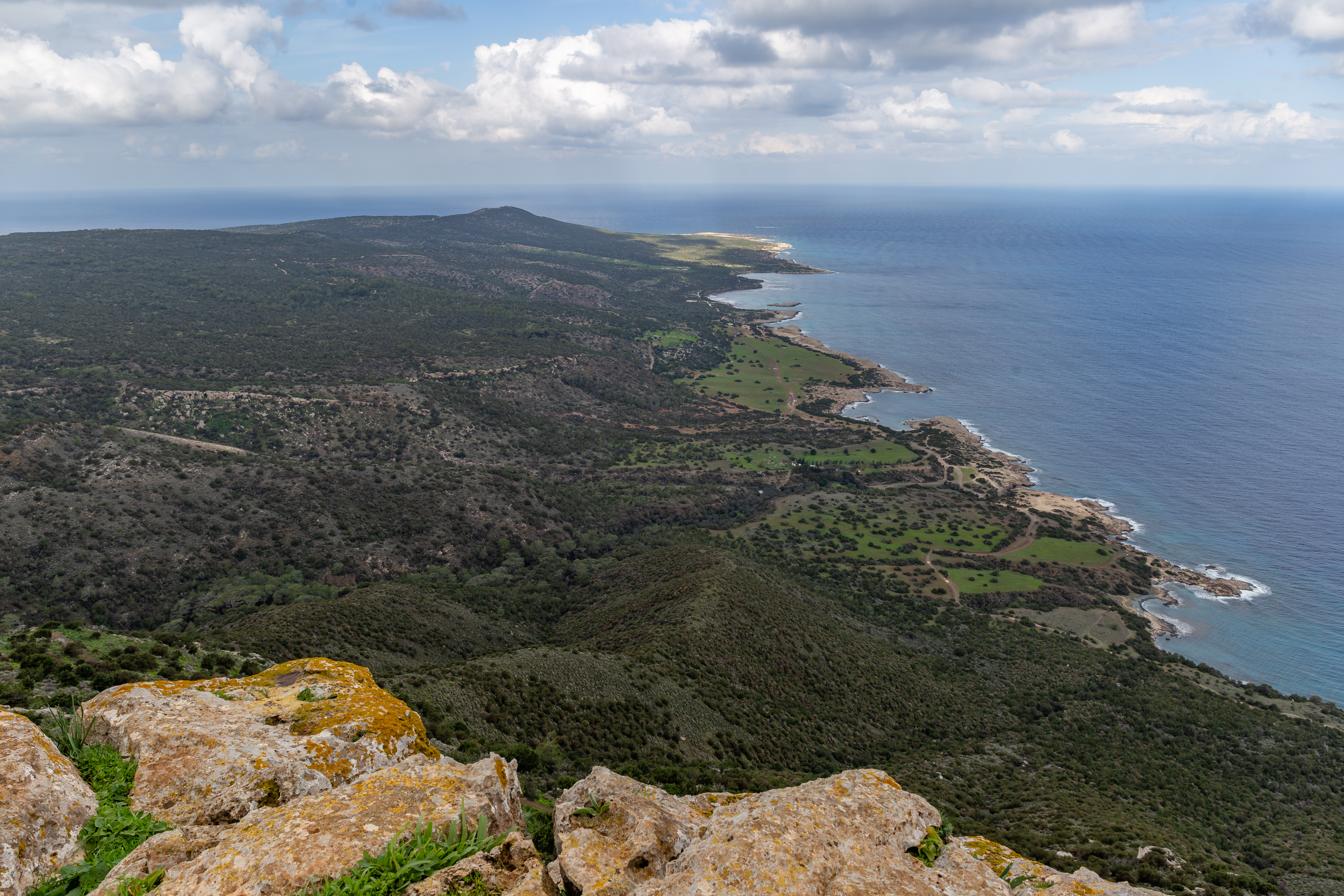
- View from Laona
- Country: Cyprus
- District: Paphos District
- Regional center: Kathikas

Area
  - Total: 165 km^{2} (64 sq mi)

Population
  - Total: 2,500
- Time zone: UTC+2 (EET)
  - Summer (DST): UTC+3 (EEST)
- Website: laona.org

The Laona Villages or Laona Region are 10 villages located in the vine region of Paphos.

It's here where the indigenous grape variety known as Xynisteri and Maratheftiko is found.

The Kathikas area is famous for its white grape varieties, mainly the native Xynisteri. Most of the villages in the area belong to the Appellation Controllé (OEOP) “Laona Akamas” or Laona Project which includes additional 14 villages. In all, a further 19 different varieties are cultivated in the areas. The villages also include the Akamas region.

== Villages ==
Laona, an extensive area of the Paphos district, occupying the westernmost part of Cyprus including the Akamas peninsula.

The villages are Androlykou, Drouseia, Fasli, Kathikas, Kato Arodes, Pano Arodes, Kritou terra, Neo Chorio, Ineia, Theletra and North-West Stroumpi. The route passes through Tsada and ends at Polis.

Full Route: This rugged route passes through Pafos (Paphos), Mesogi, Tsada, Stroumbi, Kathikas, Akourdaleia, Pano Arodes, Kato Arodes, Ineia, Drouseia, Polis and Pegeia.

The villages of altitude of 600 meters and above are in the Laona Plateau. There is a walking route of these villages (Kathikas, Drouseia, Inia, Pano Arodes) which offer views of the Chrysochou Bay.

== Terrain & Geology ==
The region presents a plateau dissected by steep hills, valleys, and creeks. Prominent conical hills (e.g., near Ineia) and rocky outcrops, including quartz sandstone formations like Konneftis and Gerakoptera, shape the terrain. Underlying bedrock comprises limestone, sandstone, chalk, marl, lava, serpentinite, and other formations related to the Mamonia complex—indicative of a highly varied geodiversity.

== Attractions ==
Local attractions include:

- Lara Beach and Lara Mountain both located in Ineia village.
- Inia Turtle Museum (Turtle Museum In Inia)
- Avakas Gorge (Gorge in the town of Pegeia)
- Pykni Forest (Forest in Pegeia)
- Akamas (The whole Akamas Peninsula)
- Akamas Forest (Forest located mainly in Androlykou)
- Laona Plateau (Includes only the villages in the plateau, (Kathikas, Drouseia, Ineia, Pano Arodes)
- Smigies (Smigies Camping Site located in Neo Chorio)
- Vasilikon Winery (Winery in Kathikas)

== Climate ==
The area varies from 200 to 650 metres and has an annual rate of rainfall of about 610 mm. It has a generally mild climate.

Climate data for Inia, Cyprus (626 m)
Month	Jan	Feb	Mar	Apr	May	Jun	Jul	Aug	Sep	Oct	Nov	Dec	Year
Mean daily maximum °C (°F)	12.7 (54.9)	13.2 (55.8)	15.1 (59.2)	19.0 (66.2)	23.4 (74.1)	27.9 (82.2)	30.7 (87.3)	31.1 (88.0)	27.9 (82.2)	23.8 (74.8)	19.2 (66.6)	14.7 (58.5)	21.6 (70.8)
Mean daily minimum °C (°F)	5.4 (41.7)	5.2 (41.4)	6.2 (43.2)	8.9 (48.0)	12.6 (54.7)	16.5 (61.7)	18.6 (65.5)	19.3 (66.7)	16.5 (61.7)	13.4 (56.1)	10.0 (50.0)	6.8 (44.2)	11.6 (52.9)
Average precipitation mm (inches)	136 (5.4)	94.9 (3.74)	67.1 (2.64)	33 (1.3)	11 (0.4)	1.7 (0.07)	0.8 (0.03)	0.2 (0.01)	3.3 (0.13)	41 (1.6)	81 (3.2)	140 (5.5)	610 (24.0)
Average relative humidity (%)	77	75	70	62	55	49	49	53	56	59	67	76	63
Source: Tsada Climate

Climate data for Drouseia, Cyprus (611 m)
Month	Jan	Feb	Mar	Apr	May	Jun	Jul	Aug	Sep	Oct	Nov	Dec	Year
Mean daily maximum °C (°F)	12.8 (55.0)	13.3 (55.9)	15.2 (59.4)	19.1 (66.4)	23.4 (74.1)	28 (82)	30.9 (87.6)	31.1 (88.0)	27.9 (82.2)	23.9 (75.0)	19.3 (66.7)	14.8 (58.6)	21.6 (70.9)
Mean daily minimum °C (°F)	5.5 (41.9)	5.2 (41.4)	6.3 (43.3)	8.9 (48.0)	12.5 (54.5)	16.5 (61.7)	18.7 (65.7)	19.2 (66.6)	16.4 (61.5)	13.5 (56.3)	10.0 (50.0)	6.9 (44.4)	11.6 (52.9)
Average precipitation mm (inches)	139 (5.5)	94.9 (3.74)	67.1 (2.64)	33 (1.3)	11 (0.4)	1.7 (0.07)	0.8 (0.03)	0.2 (0.01)	3.3 (0.13)	41 (1.6)	81 (3.2)	140 (5.5)	613 (24.1)
Average relative humidity (%)	77	75	70	62	55	49	49	53	56	59	67	76	63
Source: Cyprus Department of Meteorology

Climate data for Paphos (Kathikas, Cyprus 650 m) (1961–2006)
Month	Jan	Feb	Mar	Apr	May	Jun	Jul	Aug	Sep	Oct	Nov	Dec	Year
Record high °C (°F)	21.4 (70.5)	23.0 (73.4)	27.8 (82.0)	31.2 (88.2)	34.6 (94.3)	38.5 (101.3)	38.5 (101.3)	39.5 (103.1)	35.8 (96.4)	33.0 (91.4)	29.4 (84.9)	22.6 (72.7)	39.5 (103.1)
Mean daily maximum °C (°F)	11.4 (52.5)	11.6 (52.9)	14.0 (57.2)	18.2 (64.8)	22.7 (72.9)	27.1 (80.8)	29.6 (85.3)	29.1 (84.4)	26.5 (79.7)	22.8 (73.0)	17.5 (63.5)	13.1 (55.6)	20.3 (68.5)
Daily mean °C (°F)	8.4 (47.1)	8.4 (47.1)	10.4 (50.7)	14.0 (57.2)	18.2 (64.8)	22.5 (72.5)	25.2 (77.4)	24.7 (76.5)	22.1 (71.8)	18.6 (65.5)	13.9 (57.0)	10.1 (50.2)	16.4 (61.5)
Mean daily minimum °C (°F)	5.5 (41.9)	5.2 (41.4)	6.8 (44.2)	9.9 (49.8)	13.6 (56.5)	17.5 (63.5)	20.3 (68.5)	20.3 (68.5)	17.7 (63.9)	14.5 (58.1)	10.3 (50.5)	7.1 (44.8)	12.4 (54.3)
Record low °C (°F)	−2.9 (26.8)	−4.2 (24.4)	−1.5 (29.3)	0.5 (32.9)	6.5 (43.7)	9.6 (49.3)	12.9 (55.2)	10.5 (50.9)	10.5 (50.9)	5.5 (41.9)	0.7 (33.3)	−3.8 (25.2)	−4.2 (24.4)
Average precipitation mm (inches)	136.0 (5.35)	104 (4.1)	81 (3.2)	37 (1.5)	17 (0.7)	2 (0.1)	1 (0.0)	0.8 (0.03)	4 (0.2)	44 (1.7)	81 (3.2)	141 (5.6)	648.8 (25.54)
Average relative humidity (%)	77	75	70	62	55	49	49	53	56	59	67	76	63
Source: Cyprus Department of Meteorology
