= Laona-Akamas =

Laona–Akamas Region Περιοχή Λαόνα–Ακάμας
- Cultural and Ecological Region
- Interactive map of Laona–Akamas Region
- Coordinates: 35.02°N 32.36°E
- Country: Cyprus
- District: Paphos District
- Highest elevation: 683 m (2,241 ft)
- Lowest elevation: 0 m (0 ft)
- Time zone: UTC+2 (EET)
  - Summer (DST): UTC+3 (EEST)
- Postal code: 8573–8650 (range varies by village)

Laona–Akamas is a geographical and cultural region located in the northwestern part of Cyprus, within the Paphos District. It consists of the highland villages of the Laona Plateau and the ecologically rich Akamas Peninsula. The area is known for its traditional stone-built villages, winemaking heritage, biodiversity, and natural beauty. The Laona–Akamas region is a culturally rich and environmentally significant area located in the northwestern part of Cyprus, primarily within the Paphos District. It comprises a network of traditional villages, vineyards, and natural landscapes, extending from the Laona Plateau inland toward the Akamas Peninsula, a protected Natura 2000 site.

== Villages ==
Laona-Akamas have 24 villages – Polis, Polis Chrysouchous, Karamoullides, Goudi, Choli, Skoulli, Tera, Drousha, Ineia, Kato Arodes, Pano Arodes, Kritou Tera, Kato Akourdalia, Pano Akourdalia, Kathikas, Pegia, Stroumpi, Tsada, Kissonegra, Tremithousa, Mesogi, Chloraka, Paphos, Geroskipou.

== Subregions ==
- Laona Plateau: Ranges from approximately 500 to 650 meters in rolling hills, terraces, and limestone outcrops.
  - Notable villages: Kathikas, Pano Arodes, Drouseia, Ineia.
- Akamas Peninsula: Sea-level to 400 meters asl.
  - A Protected nature reserve and Natura 2000 area that features the Gorges (e.g., Avakas), rare endemic flora, sea turtle nesting beaches (Lara Bay).
- Laona Villages: Not mountainous but consistently above 500 m
  - Notable villages: Androlykou, Drouseia, Fasli, Kathikas, Kato Arodes, Kritou Terra, Neo Chorio, Pano Arodes, Ineia, Theletra, Stroumpi.

== Climate ==
The region has Mediterranean (Köppen: Csa) climate. The annual rainfall ranges from 450 mm in the Akamas Peninsula to 650 mm in the Laona Plateau. The average annual rainfall of the region is 610 mm. Average annual temperatures are around 16.5–17 °C in the elevated Laona Plateau villages, and around 18–19 °C along the coastal Akamas region.
