= Pittokopos =

Pittokopos Πιττόκοπος
- Location in Cyprus
- Coordinates: 34.97563°N 32.38533°E
- Country: Cyprus
- District: Paphos District
- Elevation: 500 m (1,600 ft)
- Highest elevation: 620 m (2,030 ft)

Population (2001)
  - Total: 0
- Time zone: UTC+2 (EET)
  - Summer (DST): UTC+3 (EEST)
- Postal code: 8705

Pittokopos (Greek: Πιττόκοπος) is a locality in Dhrousha in Cyprus, in the Paphos District.

This tiny settlement is not mentioned in medieval sources. It seems that it was founded occasionally, by a few landowners who worked in the area. Its name is a compound, from "pitta" and the verb "κοβο", but the reason why the settlement was named so is unknown.

== Climate ==
The locality receives an average of 615 mm of rainfall annually. From a transportation point of view, Pittokopos is located next to the Fasli-Inia road. Through this road it is connected to the north with the village of Fasli (about 1 km) and to the southeast with the villages of Inia (about 3 km) and Drousia (about 3 km).

Climate data for Paphos (Drouseia, Cyprus) (1961–2022)
Month	Jan	Feb	Mar	Apr	May	Jun	Jul	Aug	Sep	Oct	Nov	Dec	Year
Average precipitation mm (inches)	119 (4.7)	82 (3.2)	80 (3.1)	56 (2.2)	19 (0.7)	23 (0.9)	1 (0.0)	3 (0.1)	15 (0.6)	45 (1.8)	61 (2.4)	109 (4.3)	613 (24.1)
Source: Cyprus Department of Meteorology

Climate data for Paphos (Inia, Cyprus) (1961–2022)
Month	Jan	Feb	Mar	Apr	May	Jun	Jul	Aug	Sep	Oct	Nov	Dec	Year
Average precipitation mm (inches)	136 (5.4)	94.9 (3.74)	67.1 (2.64)	33 (1.3)	11 (0.4)	1.7 (0.07)	0.8 (0.03)	0.2 (0.01)	3.3 (0.13)	41 (1.6)	81 (3.2)	140 (5.5)	610 (24.0)
Source: Cyprus Department of Meteorology

== Topography ==
Pittokopos, Paphos district is a locality and is north of Lefki and southeast of Fásli. Pittokopos has an elevation of 500 metres and is near Agía Aféntrika. Pittokopos peak is 620 m in altitude.

== Nearby places ==
- Dhrousha (2.3 km), Inia (2.4 km), Androlykou (3.4 km), Terra (4.5 km), Kritou Terra (4.9 km)
- Nearby cities: Polis Chrysochous

== Post code ==
Pittokopos' post code is 8705.
