= Laona Plateau =

The Laona Plateau is a plateau in Cyprus, sitting at an elevation of around 600 metres. It contains four stone-built villages of the Laona Region: Kathikas, Inia, Drouseia and Pano Arodes. A walking route connects the villages.

== Villages ==
Kathikas: Kathikas is situated on a plateau at an elevation of 635 metres.

Pano Arodes: Pano Arodes lies on the Laona Plateau at an altitude of approximately 600 metres, distinguished by its traditional stone architecture.

Ineia: Ineia is located on the Laona Plateau at an altitude of around 605 metres, known for its views over the Akamas Peninsula and its heritage in traditional winemaking.

Drouseia: Drouseia is a village set at approximately 625 metres above sea level on the Laona Plateau, overlooking Chrysochou Bay and the Akamas Peninsula.

== Topography ==
The Laona Plateau is a gently undulating upland region located in the northwestern part of the Paphos District in Cyprus, rising to elevations between 550 and 650 metres above sea level. The highest point is Kathikas, at 683 meters above sea level (Mazi Mountain). Settlements are historically located on the higher, flatter parts of the plateau, offering a cooler climate and defensive positions. Although located in a lower altitude sometimes Miliou is mentioned in the Laona Plateau along with Kato Arodes.

== Geology ==
The dominant geology is limestone, specifically the Pakhna and Terra formations. This soft, permeable rock is central to the plateau's topography. It is easily eroded by water, which has led to the formation of its most spectacular features: deep gorges and ravines. The landscape is a classic example of karstic topography.

== Climate ==
The Laona Plateau in Cyprus has a mild climate with cool winters and hot, dry summers, influenced by its location on the Akamas peninsula and its altitude. The area is characterized by an annual rainfall of about 610 mm and an average annual temperature of 16.6 °C. The plateau's elevation, ranging from 550 to 650 meters, contributes to its cooler and less humid conditions compared to coastal areas, especially during the summer months.
