= Arodes =

Arodes may refer to:

- Kato Arodes, a village in Cyprus
- Pano Arodes, a village in Cyprus
