= Vlampouros =

Mountain in Paphos District, Cyprus

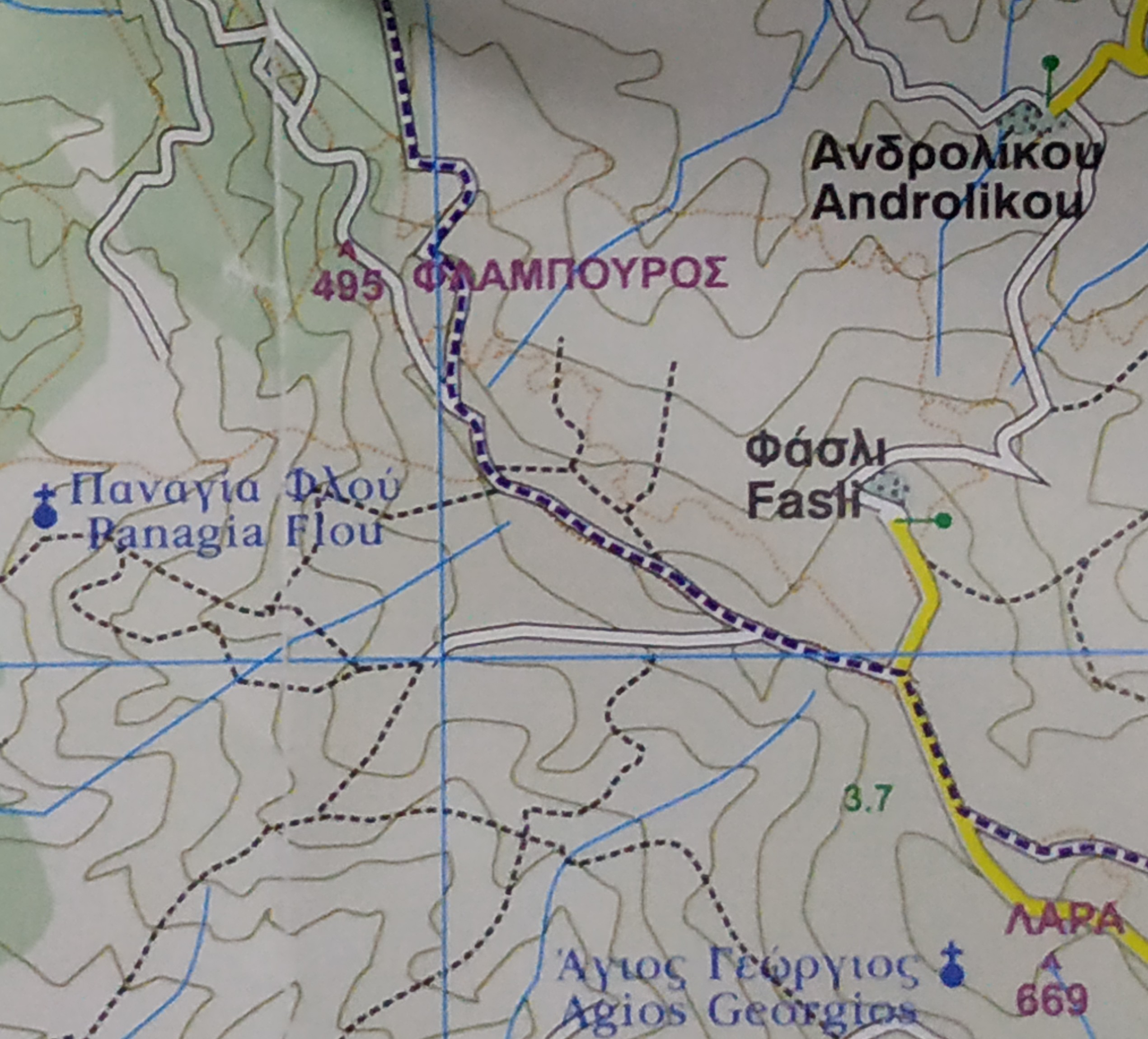
- Location of Vlampouros
- Nickname: Flampouros
- Mountain in Fasli, Cyprus
- Coordinates: 34°59′28″N 32°20′53″E
- Country: Cyprus
- District: Paphos District
- Elevation: 1,611 ft (491 m)
- Highest elevation: 1,624 ft (495 m)
- Time zone: UTC+2 (EET)
  - Summer (DST): UTC+3 (EEST)

Vlampouros is a mountain in Fasli in the Paphos District of Cyprus. It is located at 495 m above sea level. The terrain around Vlampouros is mainly hilly only to the west is flat. The sea is located to the southwest. The nearest larger community is Pegeia, 12.3 km south of Vlampouros.

== Geography ==
The terrain around Vlampouros is mainly hilly, but flat to the west. The sea is near Vlampouros to the southwest.

Fasli is located 2.5 km southeast of Vlampouros. The Kerati hill is very close to Vlampouros Mountain.

=== Climate ===
The climate in the area is temperate . Average annual temperature in the neighborhood is 20 °C . The hottest month is July, when the average temperature is 31 °C, and the coldest is February, with 10 °C. Average annual rainfall is 631 millimeters. The driest month is January, with an average of 141 mm of precipitation, and the driest month is August, with 2 mm of precipitation.
