= Kritou =

Kritou may refer to:

- Kritou Marottou, Paphos District, Cyprus
- Kritou Tera, Paphos Districe, Cyprus
