= Pykni Forest =

Forest in Cyprus

- Location within Cyprus
- Location: Pegeia, Paphos District, Cyprus
- Coordinates: 34.870°N 32.370°E
- Area: 1.8 km^{2} (0.69 sq mi)
- Elevation: 300–450 m
- Governing body: Department of Forests, Cyprus
- Website: Department of Forests

Pykni Forest, or Pikni Forest, is a forest above Pegeia, Cyprus, managed by the Department of Forests of Cyprus. It can be found on the Pegeia - Kathikas bypass road, 3 km from Pegeia, and 6 km from Kathikas.

== Activities ==
It includes the Pykni Picnic Site, which has a capacity of 500 persons. It includes a hiking trail, which climbs from 305 meters to 393 meters above sea level. A second hiking loop trail reaches 423 meters above sea level.

Visitors of the Pykni Picnic Site can encounter wildlife.

== Geography ==
Pykni forest is located approximately 18 kilometers northwest of Paphos in the homonymous province of Cyprus, and approximately 3.5 kilometers from Peyia.

=== Climate ===
Climate data for Pegeia, Cyprus (241 m)
Month	Jan	Feb	Mar	Apr	May	Jun	Jul	Aug	Sep	Oct	Nov	Dec	Year
Mean daily maximum °C (°F)	15.7 (60.3)	16.0 (60.8)	17.7 (63.9)	20.9 (69.6)	24.8 (76.6)	29.1 (84.4)	31.6 (88.9)	32.0 (89.6)	29.6 (85.3)	25.9 (78.6)	21.7 (71.1)	17.6 (63.7)	23.6 (74.4)
Mean daily minimum °C (°F)	7.4 (45.3)	7.3 (45.1)	8.3 (46.9)	10.4 (50.7)	13.9 (57.0)	17.5 (63.5)	19.7 (67.5)	20.1 (68.2)	17.9 (64.2)	15.1 (59.2)	11.8 (53.2)	8.9 (48.0)	13.2 (55.7)
Source: Climate-Data.org
