= Fyti =

- Location within Cyprus
- Coordinates: 34°55′44″N 32°32′41″E
- Country: Cyprus
- District: Paphos District
- Elevation: 680 m (2,230 ft)

Population (2011)
  - Total: 150

Fyti (Greek: Φύτη or Φοίτη) is a village in the Paphos District of Cyprus. It is situated on a plateau 25 km north-east of Paphos and 20 km south-east of Polis. There are several small villages within a 3 km radius of Fyti, including Lasa, Kritou Marottou and Anadiou, all residing at an average altitude of 680 m.

== Climate ==
Due to the altitude and cover from the surrounding landscape, Fyti enjoys a pleasant climate all year round with long dry summers and winters that still remain warm and predominantly dry, rarely seeing frost or snow. The annual rainfall is 640 mm.

== About ==
Fyti, along with two other villages in the Paphos district, have been ranked as grade A tourism villages. The houses are built of local stone and have changed little since the village was created in the 19th century.

The population of the village has fluctuated throughout the years and in the 2001 census the community's inhabitants numbered 97.

During the early 20th century, the village became a spiritual and educational centre for studying, and the children from neighbouring villages would travel to Fyti for their education, which is from where the village is said to have acquired its name, as the Greek word "foito", sometimes written as "foiti", translates to "study".

Fyti is the main centre of the weaving craft in the district of Paphos and is one of the most important weaving centres in Cyprus. Phythkiotika is the name given to the textiles manufactured in the village and they are known for the flamboyant coloring and variety of patterns employed in their designs.

Visitors can study the village heritage by visiting the museum of weaving and folkloric art or admire the architecture including the stone houses and two stone fountains. There are also two taverns.
