= Inia (disambiguation) =

== Science ==
- Inia, genus of river dolphins

== Geography ==
- Inia, Paphos, village in Cyprus

== Other uses ==
- Ibrahim Nasir International Airport, former name of the Velana International Airport in the Maldives
