= Akourdaleia =

Akourdaleia may refer to:

- Kato Akourdaleia, Paphos District, Cyprus
- Pano Akourdaleia, Paphos District, Cyprus
