= Lára (Cyprus) =

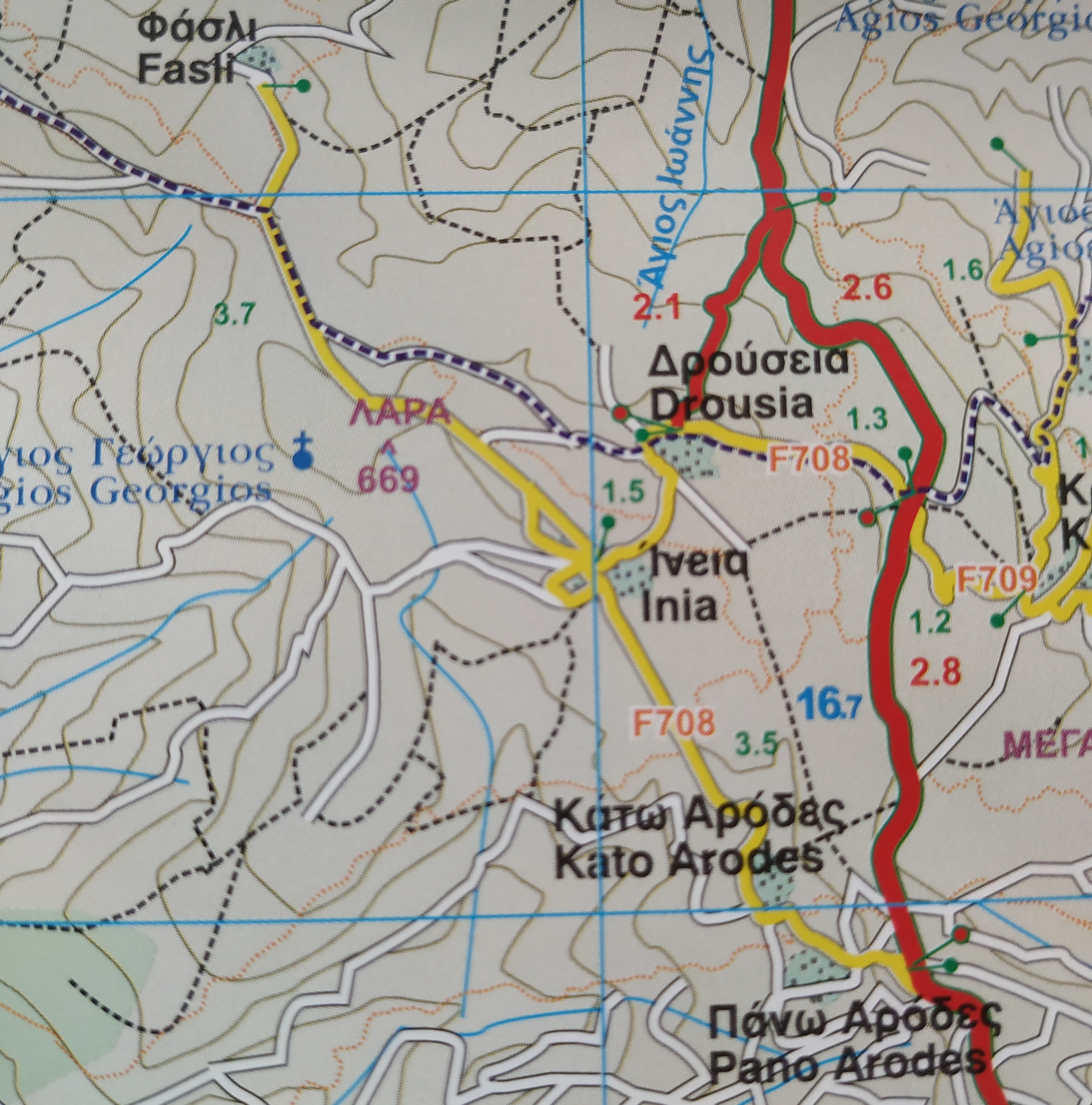
- Location of Lára
- Nickname: Lara
- Mountain in Ineia
- Coordinates: 34°57′45″N 32°22′37″E
- Country: Cyprus
- District: Paphos District
- Elevation: 667 m (2,188 ft)
- Highest elevation: 669 m (2,195 ft)
- Time zone: UTC+2 (EET)
  - Summer (DST): UTC+3 (EEST)

Lara or Lára (Greek:Λάρα) is a mountain in Ineia in the Paphos District of Cyprus. Is located at 669 m above sea level. The terrain around Lára is mainly hilly. The nearest larger community is Empa, 17.7 km south of Lára. It receives 631 mm of rainfall annually.
