= Mazi (Cyprus) =

- Mountain in Akoursos
- Coordinates: 34°53′45″N 32°26′21″E
- Country: Cyprus
- District: Paphos District
- Elevation: 683 m (2,241 ft)
- Time zone: UTC+2 (EET)
  - Summer (DST): UTC+3 (EEST)

Mazi is a mountain in Kathikas in Paphos District located at 683 m above sea level.

== Topography ==
Mazi, Paphos district is a mountain and is north of Lakkos tou Fragkou and south of Katsarkes. Mazi has an elevation of 683 metres, and is nearby to Ágios Geórgios and Ágios Agríppas.

== Other ==
Mazi is listed the 7th highest mountain in Cyprus.
