= Fasli, Cyprus =

Fasli Φάσλι
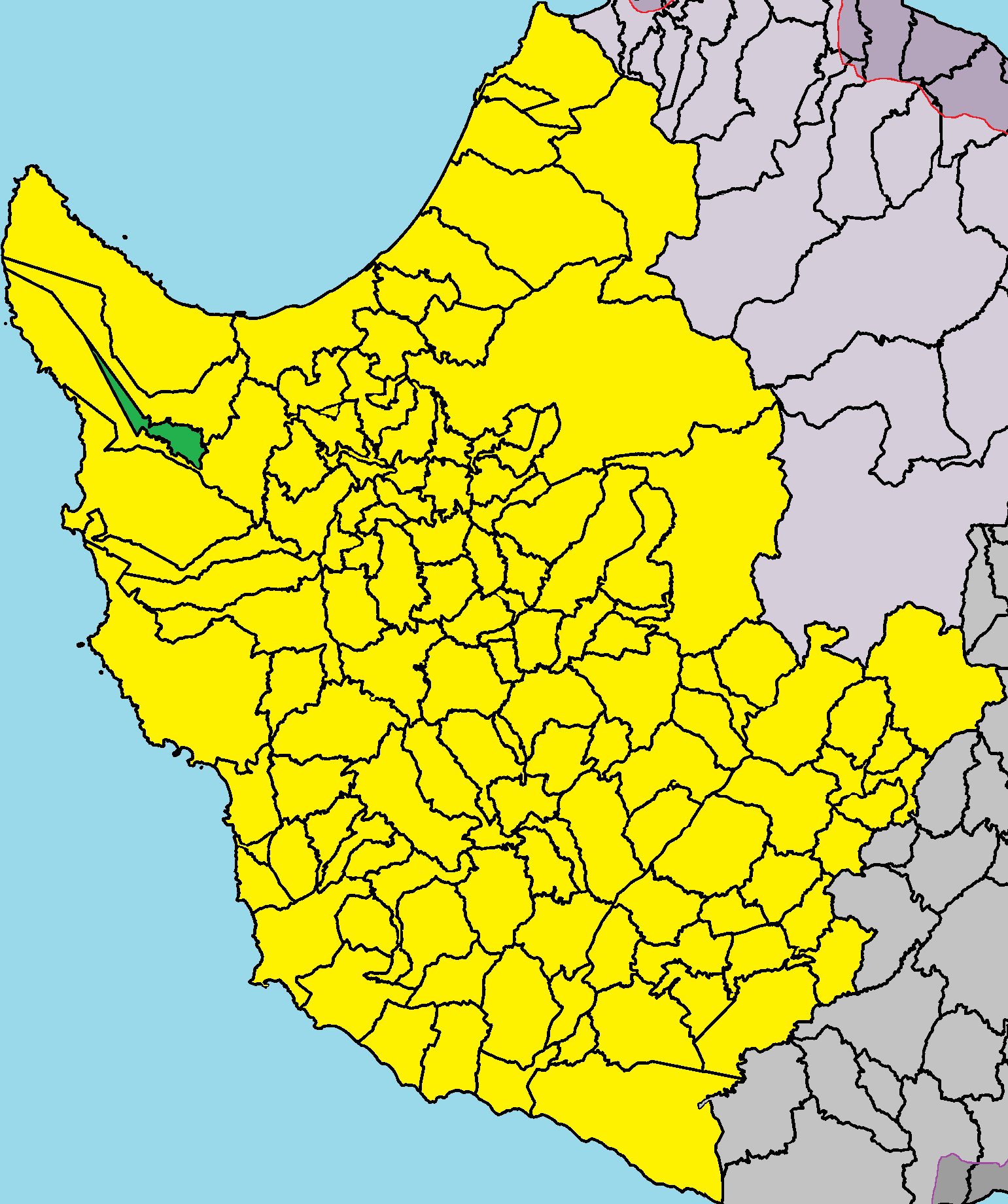
- Map showing Fasli, Cyprus in Paphos District.

- Location in Cyprus
- Coordinates: 34.9817°N 32.3706°E
- Country: Cyprus
- District: Paphos District
- Elevation: 1,690 ft (515 m)
- Highest elevation: 1,870 ft (570 m)
- Lowest elevation: 460 ft (140 m)

Population (2001)
  - Total: 0
- Time zone: UTC+2 (EET)
  - Summer (DST): UTC+3 (EEST)
- Postal code: 6354

Fasli (Greek: Φάσλι) is an abandoned Turkish Cypriot village in the Paphos District of Cyprus, located 2 km south of Androlikou.

== Naming ==
Fasli is a village located near the Akamas peninsula, nine kilometers southwest of Polis and four kilometers northwest of Dhrousha. It is believed by many that the name Phasli or Fasli derives from fasla, meaning "plot of land". The villagers of Androlikou and Fasli believe that after a land dispute in Androlikou, the agha of the village told one of the opponents that he was willing to give him one fasla if he agreed to move where the current village is situated. He apparently accepted the offer, and the village was founded and called Fasla. The Turkish Cypriots eventually slightly changed the name from "Fasla" to "Faslı". The Ottoman word "fasla", on the other hand, may be translated as "a date-palm sucker planted out".

"Fasli" is often misspelled as "Phasli".

== Altitude ==
Fasli is located 515 m above sea level.

The average annual rainfall in Laona ranges between 450 and 650 millimeters. In Smigies the average annual rainfall for the period 1951-1980 was 534 millimeters, in Drouseia 614 millimeters and in Kathikas 651 millimeters.
