= Anadiou =

Anadiou Αναδιού Anadhiou
- Location in Cyprus
- Coordinates: 34°56′41″N 32°33′56″E
- Country: Cyprus
- District: Paphos District
- Elevation: 1,667 ft (508 m)

Population (2001)
  - Total: 6
- Time zone: UTC+2 (EET)
  - Summer (DST): UTC+3 (EEST)
- Postal code: 6311

Anadiou (Greek: Αναδιού, Turkish: Görmeli), sometimes Anadhiou, is a largely deserted Turkish Cypriot village in the Paphos District of Cyprus, located 3 kilometres northeast of Fyti, and located 79 kilometres southwest of the capital Nicosia. After 2006, people started moving into the village again.

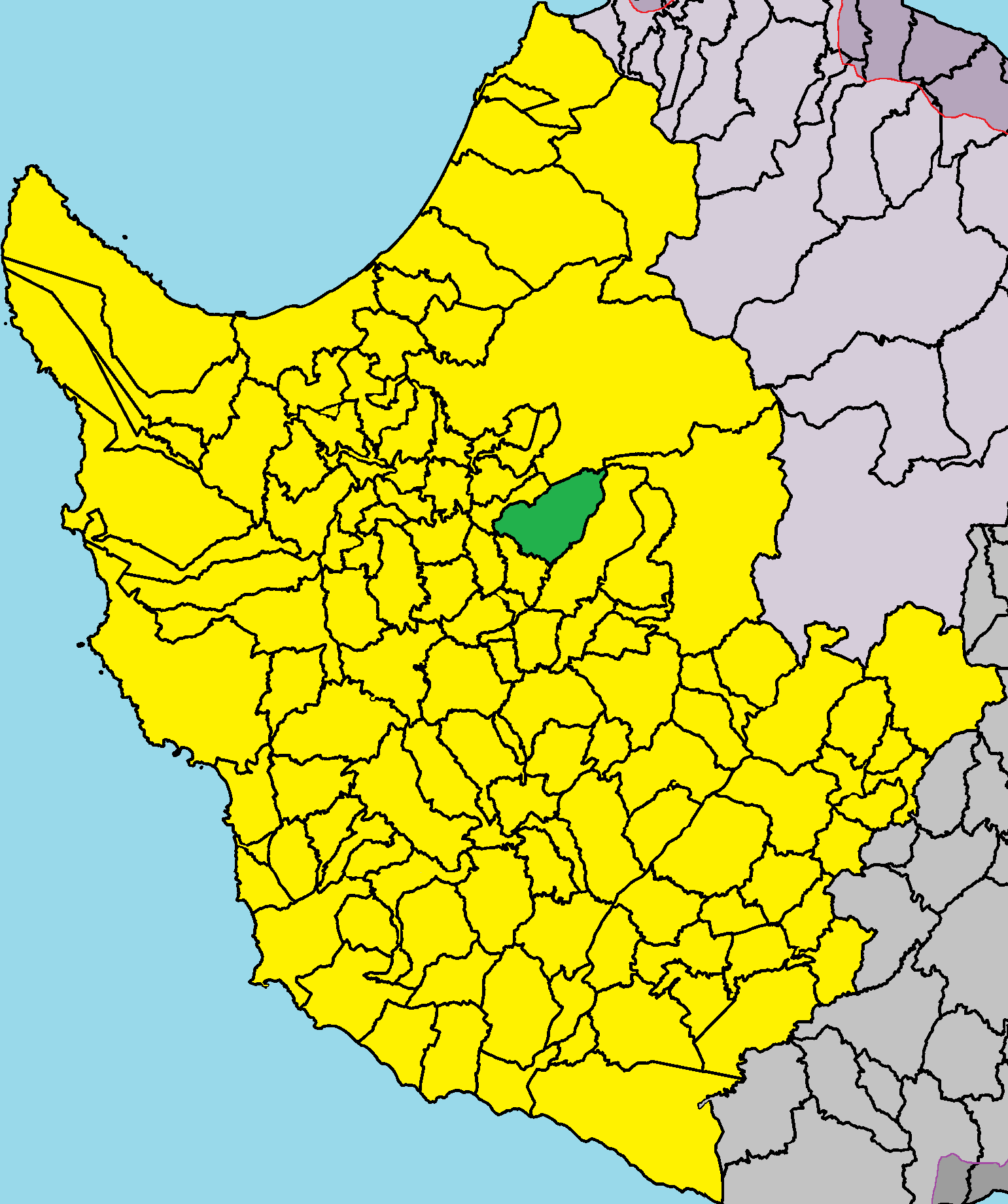
Anadiou within the Paphos District
