= Theletra =

Theletra Θελέτρα
- Location in Cyprus
- Coordinates: 34°54′42″N 32°26′51″E
- Country: Cyprus
- District: Paphos District
- Elevation: 583 m (1,913 ft)
- Highest elevation: 672 m (2,205 ft)

Population (2001)
  - Total: 177
- Time zone: UTC+2 (EET)
  - Summer (DST): UTC+3 (EEST)
- Postal code: 6330

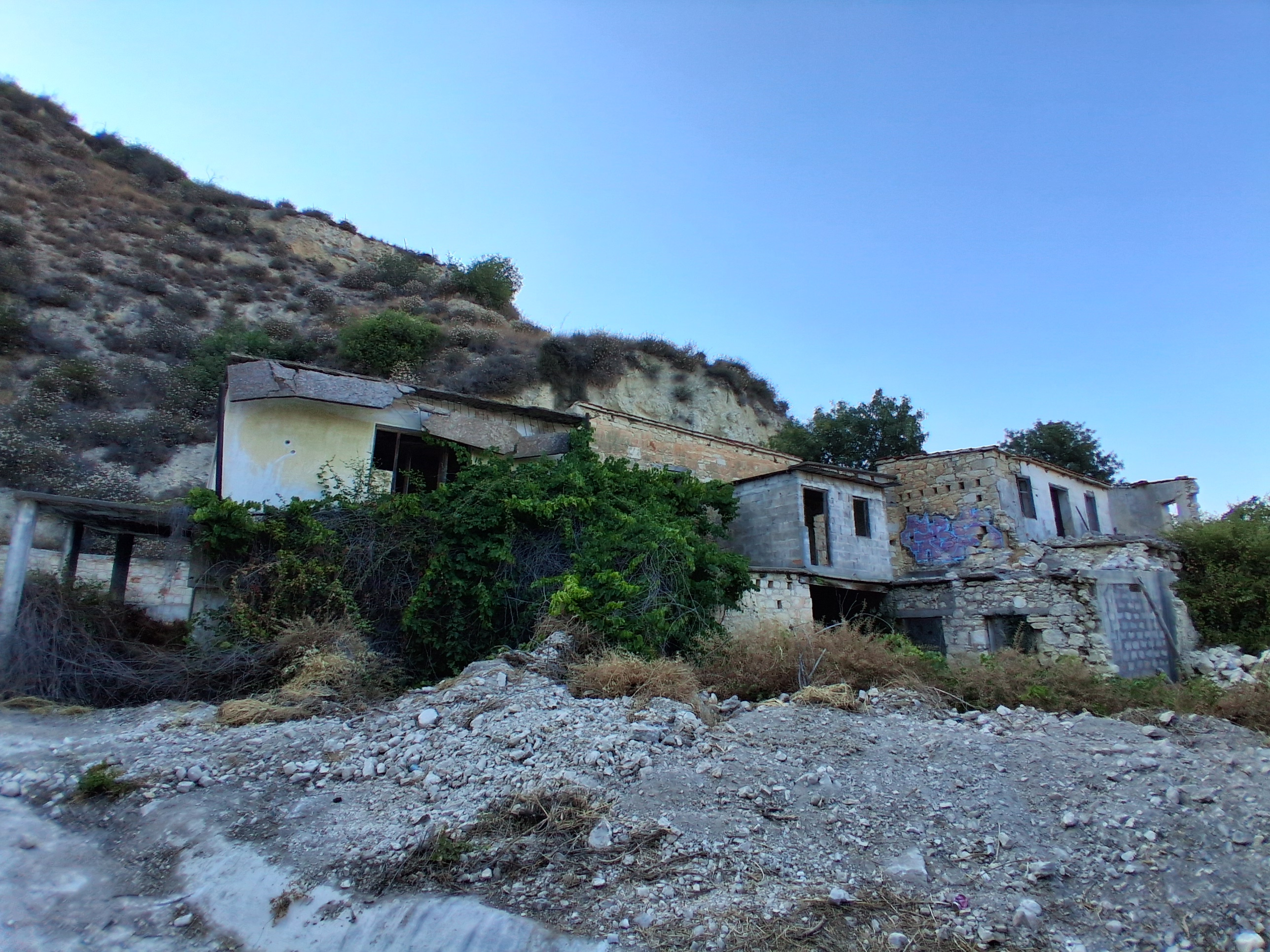
Abandoned houses in Theletra

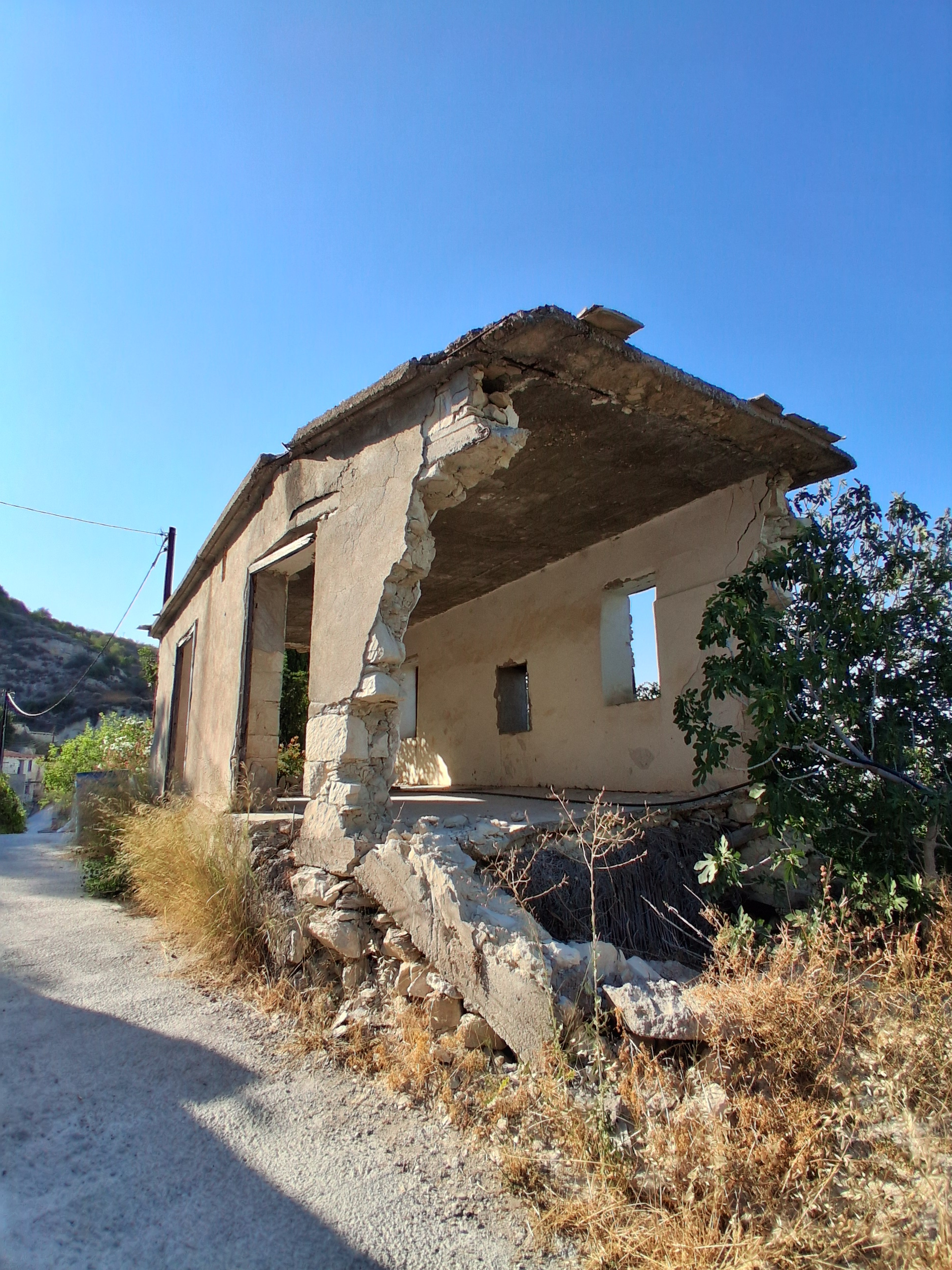
ruin in Theletra

Theletra (Greek: Θελέτρα) is a village in the Paphos District of Cyprus, located 3 km east of Kathikas. Theletra is located at 583m above sea level. It has 269 residents.
The village is accessible from the road that goes to Polis Chrysochou, after Stroumbi Village 500 meters to the left. There is an old village of Theletra and the new village. The old village was abandoned because of a huge earthquake that made the nearby hills collapse. The exact date is not verified. Katsarkes is a locality nearby, located at 657 meters above sea level.

In some instances the altitude exceeds 660 m.

== Climate ==
Climate data for Paphos (Theletra, Cyprus 580 m) (1961–2022)
Month	Jan	Feb	Mar	Apr	May	Jun	Jul	Aug	Sep	Oct	Nov	Dec	Year
Average precipitation mm (inches)	141 (5.6)	109 (4.3)	67 (2.6)	38 (1.5)	30 (1.2)	1.4 (0.06)	0.2 (0.01)	0.0 (0.0)	10 (0.4)	43 (1.7)	81 (3.2)	140 (5.5)	660 (26.0)
Source: Cyprus Department of Meteorology

== Old Theletra ==
What many people do not know is that the so-called ‘New Theletra’ at the top of a hill is home to 269 inhabitants, while Old Theletra at the bottom of the hill has hardly any inhabitants, with the old village abandoned because of a huge earthquake that caused a great landslide estimated to have occurred about 40 years ago, as villagers fled their homes and set up a new base higher on the hills.
