= Stroumpi =

Stroumpi Στρουμπί Stroumbi
- Location in Cyprus
- Coordinates: 34°52′58″N 32°28′55″E
- Country: Cyprus
- District: Paphos District
- Elevation: 500 m (1,600 ft)
- Highest elevation: 613 m (2,011 ft)
- Lowest elevation: 300 m (980 ft)

Population (2011)
  - Total: 540
- Time zone: UTC+2 (EET)
  - Summer (DST): UTC+3 (EEST)
- Annual Rainfall: 665 mm
- Average Temperature: 17.1 °C

Stroumpi or Stroumbi (Greek: Στρουμπί Stroumpí) is a small village in central Paphos District, Cyprus, and halfway between Paphos and Polis. The name of the village is said to derive from its founder, a man called "Stroumpos", or the shape of the surrounding hills (stroumpoula, meaning "rounded"). The village is known for its annual "Dionysia" wine festival named after Dionysos, the ancient Greek god of wine, that takes place next to central square where the Ayias Sophias church is located at the end of August. A now-defunct "Dionysos" volleyball team was based in Stroumpi and played in the Cypriot top league.

A 6.0 earthquake in 1953 destroyed the original settlement at Stroumpi, killing many. The village was rebuilt at a nearby location shortly after. The village is located in an altitude of 500 m. It receives about 665 millimetres of rainfall annually. The highest point is in the borders with Kathikas 613 m.

Stroumbi is located about 15 kilometres north-east of Pafos.

The village is built at an average altitude of 450 metres and receives an average annual rainfall of about 665 millimetres. Vines of mostly wine-making varieties, fruit-trees, almond, olive, and walnut trees are cultivated in its region.

== Climate ==
Climate data for Stroumpi, Cyprus (495 m)
Month	Jan	Feb	Mar	Apr	May	Jun	Jul	Aug	Sep	Oct	Nov	Dec	Year
Mean daily maximum °C (°F)	13.7 (56.7)	14.2 (57.6)	16.0 (60.8)	19.8 (67.6)	24.0 (75.2)	28.6 (83.5)	31.3 (88.3)	31.6 (88.9)	28.6 (83.5)	24.5 (76.1)	20.2 (68.4)	15.7 (60.3)	22.3 (72.2)
Mean daily minimum °C (°F)	5.9 (42.6)	5.7 (42.3)	6.8 (44.2)	9.2 (48.6)	12.8 (55.0)	16.6 (61.9)	18.7 (65.7)	19.2 (66.6)	16.6 (61.9)	13.6 (56.5)	10.4 (50.7)	7.4 (45.3)	11.9 (53.4)
Average precipitation mm (inches)	141.0 (5.55)	109 (4.3)	85 (3.3)	38 (1.5)	20 (0.8)	2 (0.1)	2 (0.1)	1 (0.0)	5 (0.2)	43 (1.7)	81 (3.2)	146 (5.7)	671.4 (26.43)
Average precipitation days (≥ 1.0 mm)	12.4	8.5	6.1	3.6	3.2	0.3	0.1	0.0	1.1	4.3	4.3	10.8	54.7
Average relative humidity (%)	77	75	70	62	55	49	49	53	56	59	67	76	63
Source: Cyprus Department of Meteorology

Climate data for Tsada, Cyprus (600 m)
Month	Jan	Feb	Mar	Apr	May	Jun	Jul	Aug	Sep	Oct	Nov	Dec	Year
Mean daily maximum °C (°F)	13 (55)	13.5 (56.3)	15.4 (59.7)	19.2 (66.6)	23.4 (74.1)	28.0 (82.4)	30.7 (87.3)	31.0 (87.8)	27.9 (82.2)	24.0 (75.2)	19.4 (66.9)	15.1 (59.2)	21.7 (71.1)
Mean daily minimum °C (°F)	5.6 (42.1)	5.3 (41.5)	6.4 (43.5)	9.0 (48.2)	12.5 (54.5)	16.5 (61.7)	18.6 (65.5)	19.2 (66.6)	16.5 (61.7)	13.5 (56.3)	10.1 (50.2)	7.1 (44.8)	11.7 (53.1)
Average precipitation mm (inches)	168.2 (6.62)	72.13 (2.84)	45.15 (1.78)	14.65 (0.58)	5.75 (0.23)	0.2 (0.01)	0.05 (0.00)	0.0 (0.0)	14.45 (0.57)	44.7 (1.76)	80.9 (3.19)	175.1 (6.89)	621.28 (24.46)
Average relative humidity (%)	77	75	70	62	55	49	49	53	56	59	67	75	63
Source: Climate Tsada

Climate data for Paphos (Kathikas, Cyprus 650 m) (1961–2006)
Month	Jan	Feb	Mar	Apr	May	Jun	Jul	Aug	Sep	Oct	Nov	Dec	Year
Record high °C (°F)	21.4 (70.5)	23.0 (73.4)	27.8 (82.0)	31.2 (88.2)	34.6 (94.3)	38.5 (101.3)	38.5 (101.3)	39.5 (103.1)	35.8 (96.4)	33.0 (91.4)	29.4 (84.9)	22.6 (72.7)	39.5 (103.1)
Mean daily maximum °C (°F)	11.4 (52.5)	11.6 (52.9)	14.0 (57.2)	18.2 (64.8)	22.7 (72.9)	27.1 (80.8)	29.6 (85.3)	29.1 (84.4)	26.5 (79.7)	22.8 (73.0)	17.5 (63.5)	13.1 (55.6)	20.3 (68.5)
Daily mean °C (°F)	8.4 (47.1)	8.4 (47.1)	10.4 (50.7)	14.0 (57.2)	18.2 (64.8)	22.5 (72.5)	25.2 (77.4)	24.7 (76.5)	22.1 (71.8)	18.6 (65.5)	13.9 (57.0)	10.1 (50.2)	16.4 (61.5)
Mean daily minimum °C (°F)	5.5 (41.9)	5.2 (41.4)	6.8 (44.2)	9.9 (49.8)	13.6 (56.5)	17.5 (63.5)	20.3 (68.5)	20.3 (68.5)	17.7 (63.9)	14.5 (58.1)	10.3 (50.5)	7.1 (44.8)	12.4 (54.3)
Record low °C (°F)	−2.9 (26.8)	−4.2 (24.4)	−1.5 (29.3)	0.5 (32.9)	6.5 (43.7)	9.6 (49.3)	12.9 (55.2)	10.5 (50.9)	10.5 (50.9)	5.5 (41.9)	0.7 (33.3)	−3.8 (25.2)	−4.2 (24.4)
Average precipitation mm (inches)	136.0 (5.35)	104 (4.1)	81 (3.2)	37 (1.5)	17 (0.7)	2 (0.1)	1 (0.0)	0.8 (0.03)	4 (0.2)	44 (1.7)	81 (3.2)	141 (5.6)	648.8 (25.54)
Average relative humidity (%)	77	75	70	62	55	49	49	53	56	59	67	76	63
Source: Cyprus Department of Meteorology

== Distances ==
Regarding transportation, the village stands at about the middle of the route from Pafos (17 km) to Polis Chrysochous (20 km). It is 6 km north of Tsada.
