= Terra, Cyprus =

Terra Τέρρα
- Village and Municipal District
- Location in Cyprus
- Coordinates: 34°57′58″N 32°25′27″E
- Country: Cyprus
- District: Paphos District
- Municipality: Polis Chrysochous Municipality

Government
  - Deputy Mayor: Aristos Markitsis

Population (2011)
  - Total: 36

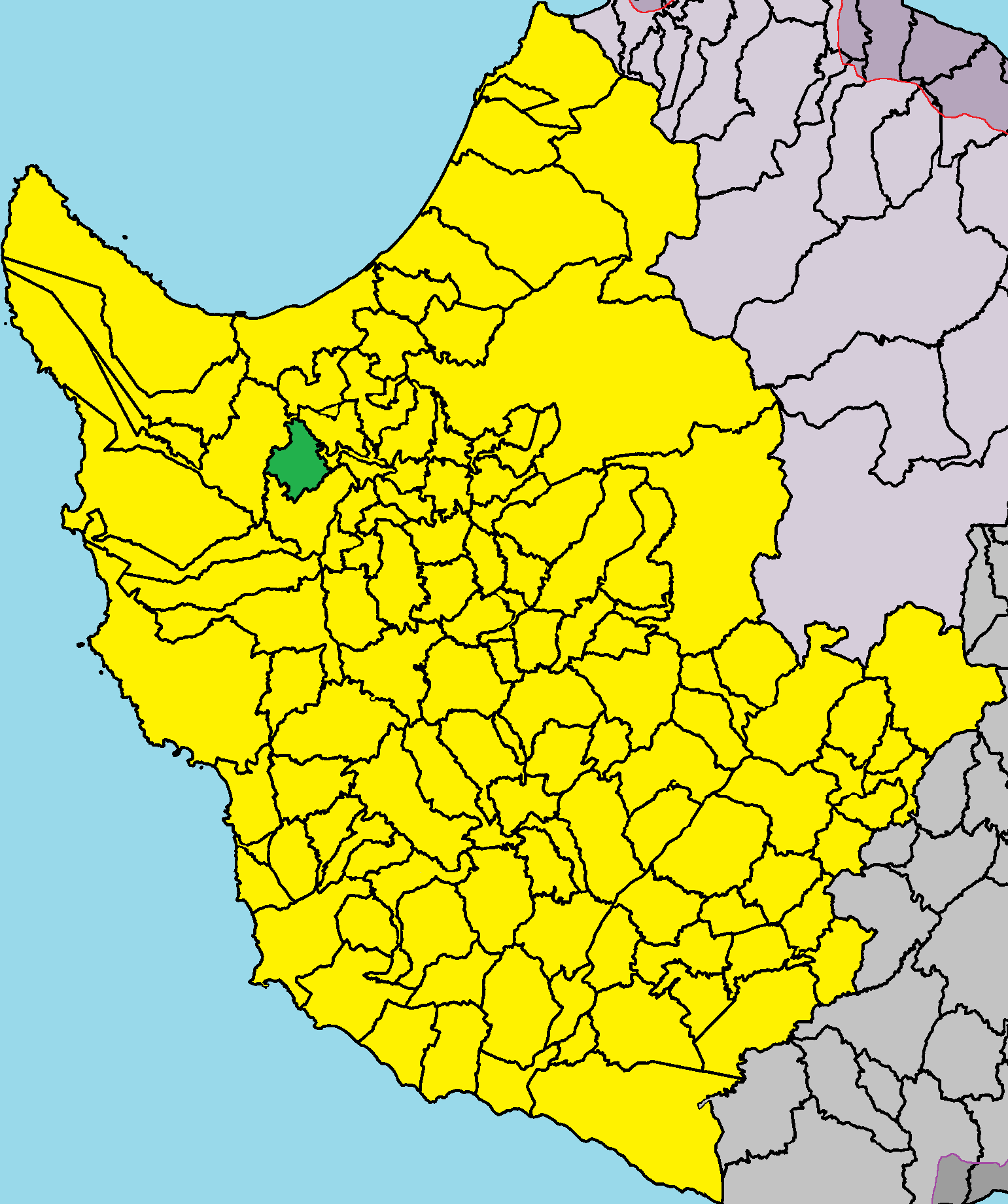
Terra in the Paphos District

Terra (Greek: Τέρρα [locally [ˈterːa]]; Turkish: Tera or Çakırlar) is a village and municipal district of Polis Chrysochous Municipality in the Paphos District of Cyprus, located 1 km north of Kritou Terra. Prior to 1974, the village was inhabited exclusively by Turkish Cypriots. In 1973, 329 Turkish Cypriots were living in Terra. As of 2011, it had a population of 36.
