= Kritou Marottou =

Kritou Marottou Κρήτου Μαρόττου
- Location in Cyprus
- Coordinates: 34°55′36″N 32°33′45″E
- Country: Cyprus
- District: Paphos District
- Elevation: 1,795 ft (547 m)

Population (2001)
  - Total: 61
- Time zone: UTC+2 (EET)
  - Summer (DST): UTC+3 (EEST)
- Postal code: 6305

Kritou Marottou (Greek: Κρήτου Μαρόττου) is a village in the Paphos District of Cyprus, located 2 km east of Fyti.
