= Androlykou =

Androlykou Ανδρολύκου Gündoğdu
- Location in Cyprus
- Coordinates: 34°59′52″N 32°22′53″E
- Country: Cyprus
- District: Paphos District
- Elevation: 310 m (1,020 ft)

Population (2001)
  - Total: 2
- Time zone: UTC+2 (EET)
  - Summer (DST): UTC+3 (EEST)
- Postal code: 6355

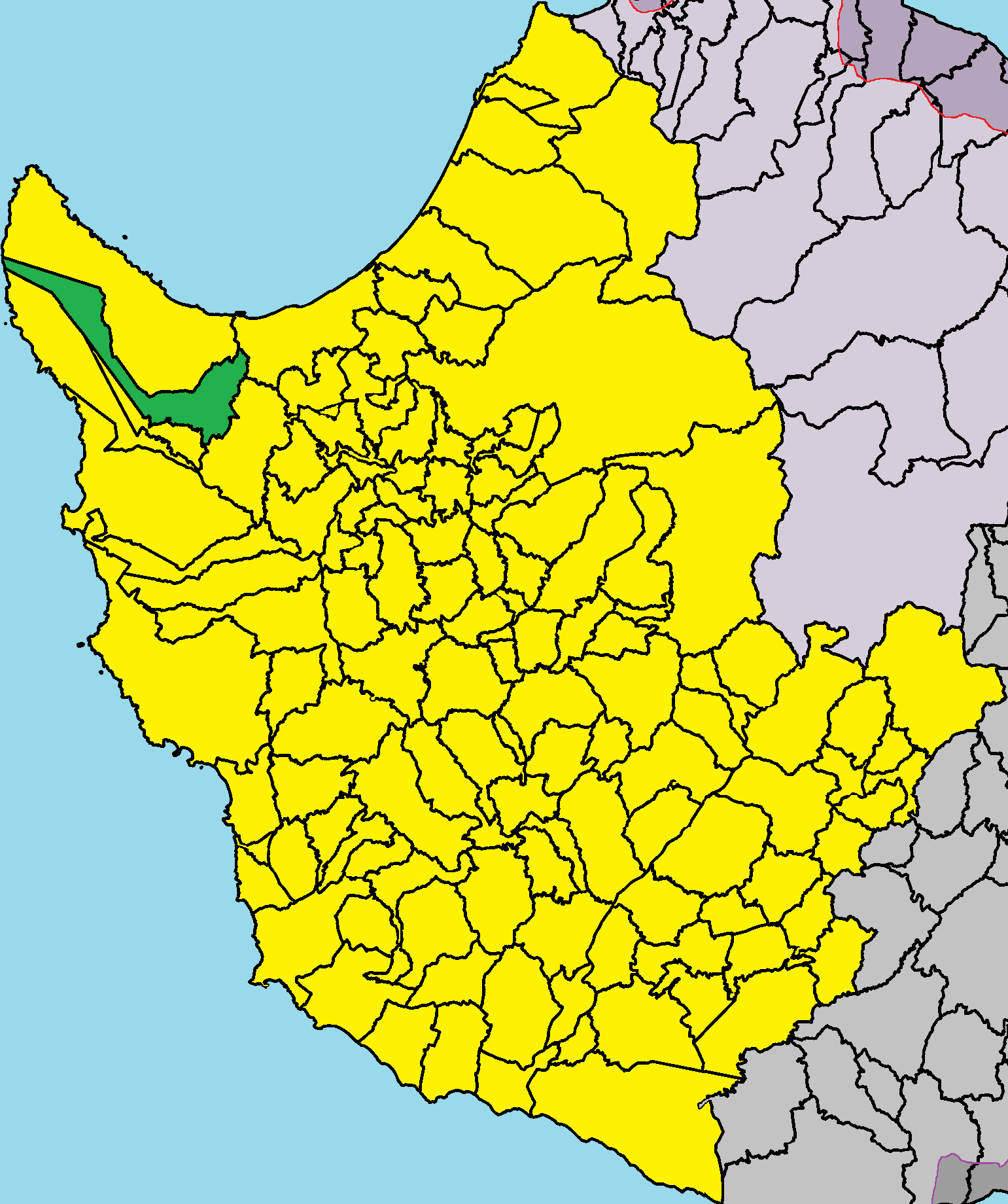
Androlykou in Paphos District.

Androlykou (Greek: Ανδρολύκου,Turkish: Gündoğdu) is a Turkish Cypriot village in the Paphos District of Cyprus, located 5 km southwest of Polis Chrysochous.

It is currently mostly empty, but before invasion it had a population of 498. At the first British census in 1881 it had a population of 255.

In October 1974 most men of fighting age were arrested and sent to the Geroskipou POW camp, while other villagers left secretly to the Turkish controlled area. 248 people remaining in the village were escorted by UNFICYP in August 1975 to the Turkish sector. Apart from one Turkish Cypriot married to a Greek Cypriot woman, the whole village was evacuated. They were mainly resettled in Myrtou.

== Topography ==
Androlykou or Androlikou is located 310 m above sea level.

== Transportation ==
The village of Androlykou is situated about 8 kilometers southeast of Polis Chrysochous and almost 9 kilometers south of the port of Latsiou and is within short distance from the Neo Chorio Paphou of the homonymous province of Cyprus.

== Nearby ==
Androlíkou, Paphos district is south of Poulliokampos and northwest of Laomilia.
