= Pano Arodes =

Coordinates: 34°56′10″N 32°24′25″E

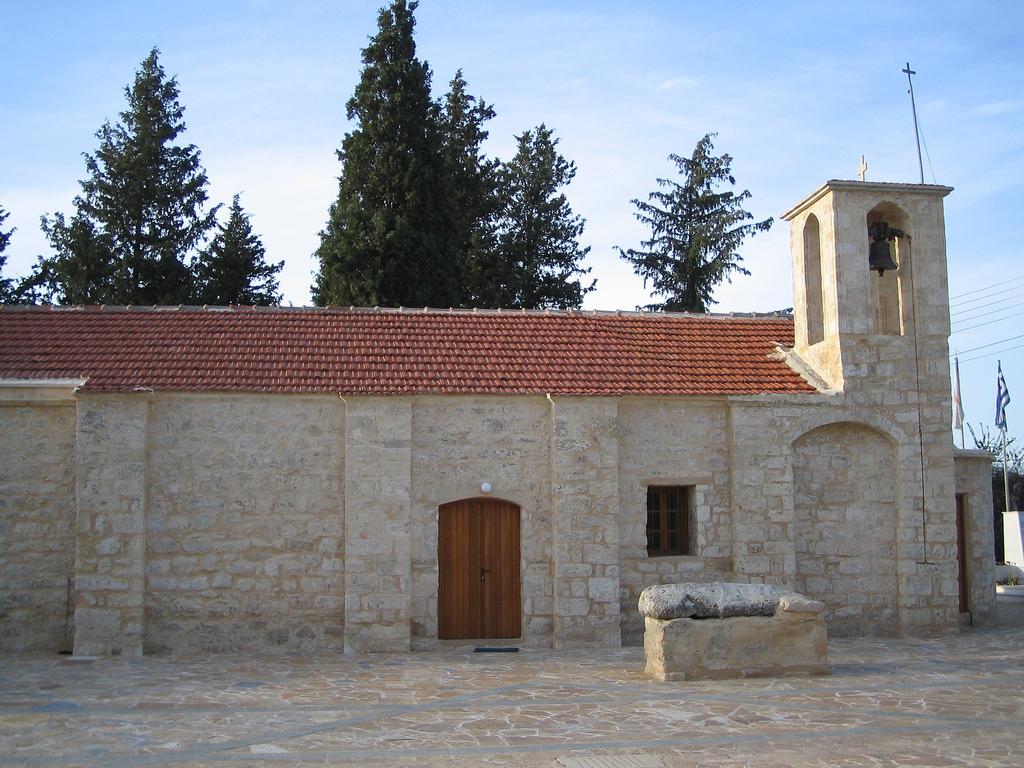
- The Village church
- Interactive map of Pano Arodes
- Country: Cyprus
- District: Paphos District
- Elevation: 590 m (1,940 ft)

Population (2011)
  - Total: 135
- Time zone: UTC+2 (EET)
  - Summer (DST): UTC+3 (EEST)

Pano Arodes (Greek: Πάνω Αρόδες) is a village in the Northwest of Cyprus close to the Akamas peninsula. It is about 23 km from the town of Paphos. The village sits on the Laona plateau.

The population of Pano Arodes has seen a decline in the past 30 years as the population has aged and younger residents move to towns for employment.

Rupert Gunnis (who was Inspector of Antiquities on the island at the time) described the village as follows:

"The medieval name of the village was Rhodes, from the fact that it was the property of the Knights of St. John of Jerusalem, whose headquarters were until 1522 in the island of Rhodes."

"The Christian village contains an eighteenth-century Church of St. Kelandion, an early bishop of Paphos. To the north side of the church lies the large stone sarcophagus of St. Agapiticos, while the companion one of St. Misiticos is to the south. The village legend is that those who wish to win the love of a person, be it a girl or boy, come secretly at night and chip off a fragment of the sarcophagus of St. Agapiticos. This is powdered and introduced into the loved one's drink, who will immediately reciprocate the donor's passion. Conversely, should a person desire to quarrel with another, he merely carries out the same procedure with powdered stone from the sarcophagus of St. Misiticos. The latter is far more worn away than that of St. Agapiticos, but this is explained by the fact that its powers are much in request by young men and women who wish to change their lovers."
