= Chrysochou =

Chrysochou Χρυσοχού Hirsofu
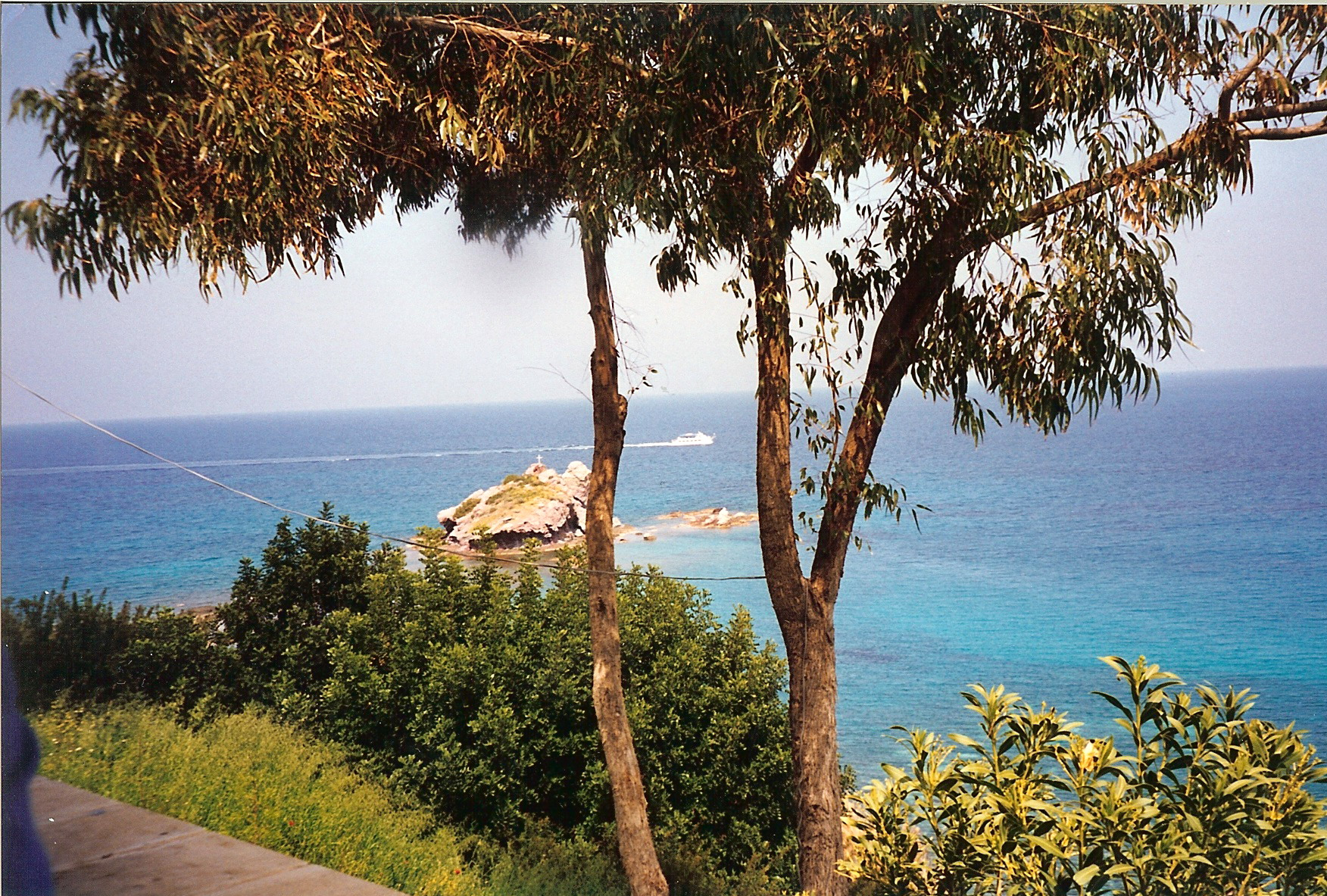

- Location in Cyprus
- Coordinates: 35°0′11″N 32°26′23″E
- Country: Cyprus
- District: Paphos District

Population (2001)
  - Total: 52
- Time zone: UTC+2 (EET)
  - Summer (DST): UTC+3 (EEST)
- Postal code: 6341

Chrysochou (Greek: Χρυσοχού, Turkish: Hirsofu) is a village in the Paphos District of Cyprus, located 3 km south of Polis Chrysochous.
