= Kritou Terra =

Kritou Terra Κρήτου Τέρρα
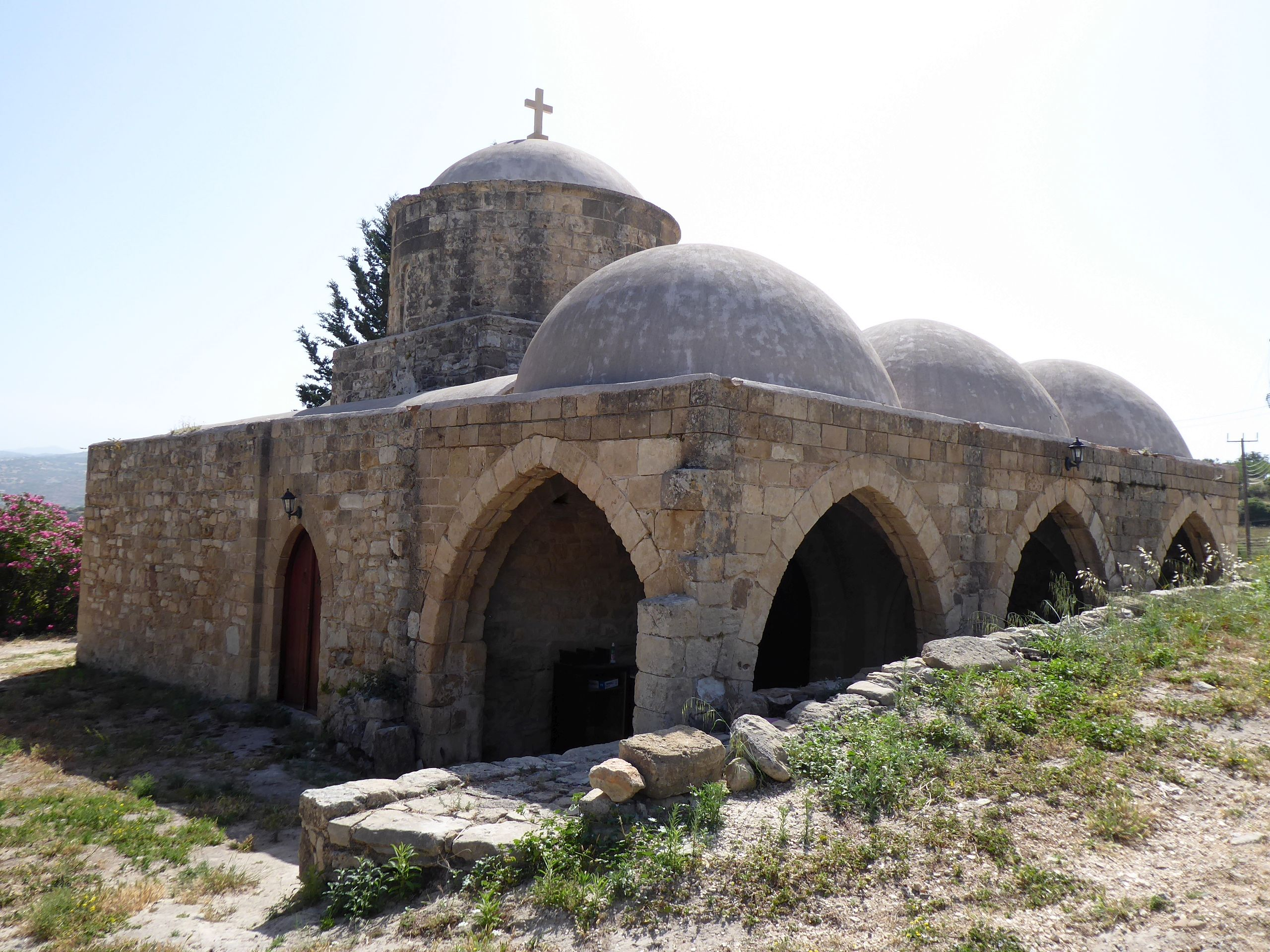
- Church of Agia Ekaterini

- Location in Cyprus
- Coordinates: 34°57′19″N 32°25′21″E
- Country: Cyprus
- District: Paphos District
- Municipality: Polis Chrysochous Municipality

Government
  - Type: Community council
- Elevation: 1,493 ft (455 m)

Population (2011)
  - Total: 86
- Time zone: UTC+2 (EET)
  - Summer (DST): UTC+3 (EEST)
- Postal code: 8724
- Website: www.kritouterra.org

Kritou Terra (Greek: Kρήτου Τέρρα [locally [ˌkritu ˈterːa]]; Turkish: Giritutera) is a village in the Paphos District of Cyprus, located 3 km east of Dhrousha. Kritou Terra is located 479 m above sea level. It receives 630 mm of rainfall annually. Situated in the area of Laona, as the wider area is called and in a landscape surrounded by high mountain peaks and to the north overlooking the Chrysochou Gulf, Kritou Terra is built at an altitude of 465 meters, is one of the ampelochoria (wine-producing villages of Cyprus) of the island and is considered one of the most beautiful and picturesque villages of the province. It has fantastic climatic conditions and because it is located by the third biggest spring in Cyprus it is green all year round.

== Climate ==
The climate is mild, and generally warm and temperate. There is more rainfall in the winter than in the summer in Kritou Terra. The annual rainfall is 630 mm. The climate here is classified as Csa by the Köppen-Geiger system. The average annual temperature in Kritou Terra is 17.2 °C.

== Distances ==
- Tsada 21 km
- Paphos 29 km
- Paphos Airport 45 km
- Larnaca Airport 171 km
