= Pegeia =

Town and municipality in Cyprus

Pegeia Πέγεια (Greek)
- Town and municipality
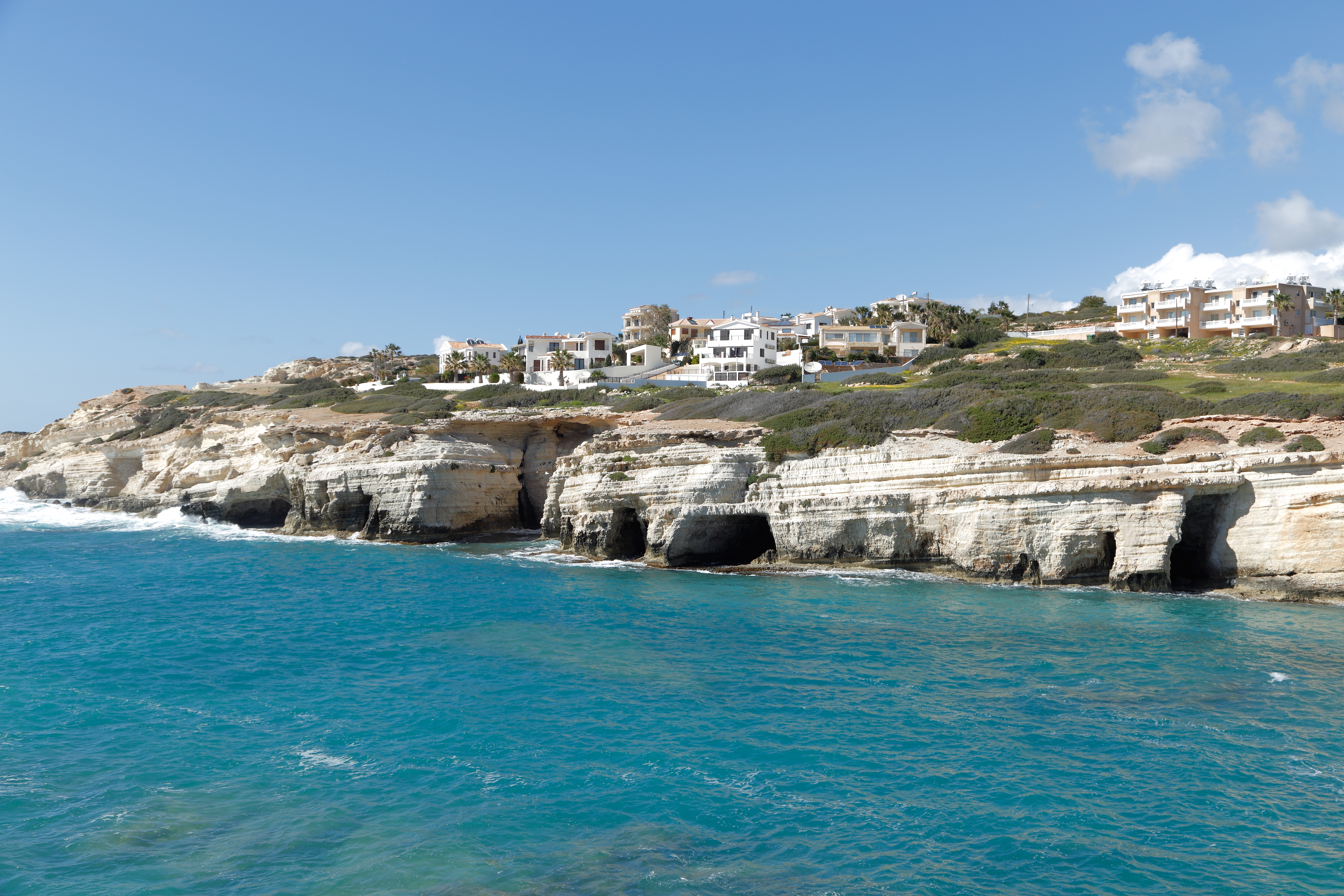
- Sea caves near Pegeia

- Location in Cyprus
- Coordinates: 34°53′0″N 32°23′0″E
- Country: Cyprus
- District: Paphos District

Government
  - Mayor: Marinos Lambrou

Population (2011)
  - Total: 12,356
  - Density: 120/sq mi (48/km^{2})
- Time zone: UTC+2 (EET)
  - Summer (DST): UTC+3 (EEST)
- Postal code: 8560
- Website: pegeiamunicipality.com

Pegeia or Peyia (Greek: Πέγεια, pronounced [ˈpeʝa]) is a town and municipality in the Paphos District of Cyprus. It is located 14 km northwest of Paphos, at the southern end of the Akamas Peninsula, and is situated mainly on steep coastal hills near Coral Bay.

== Overview ==
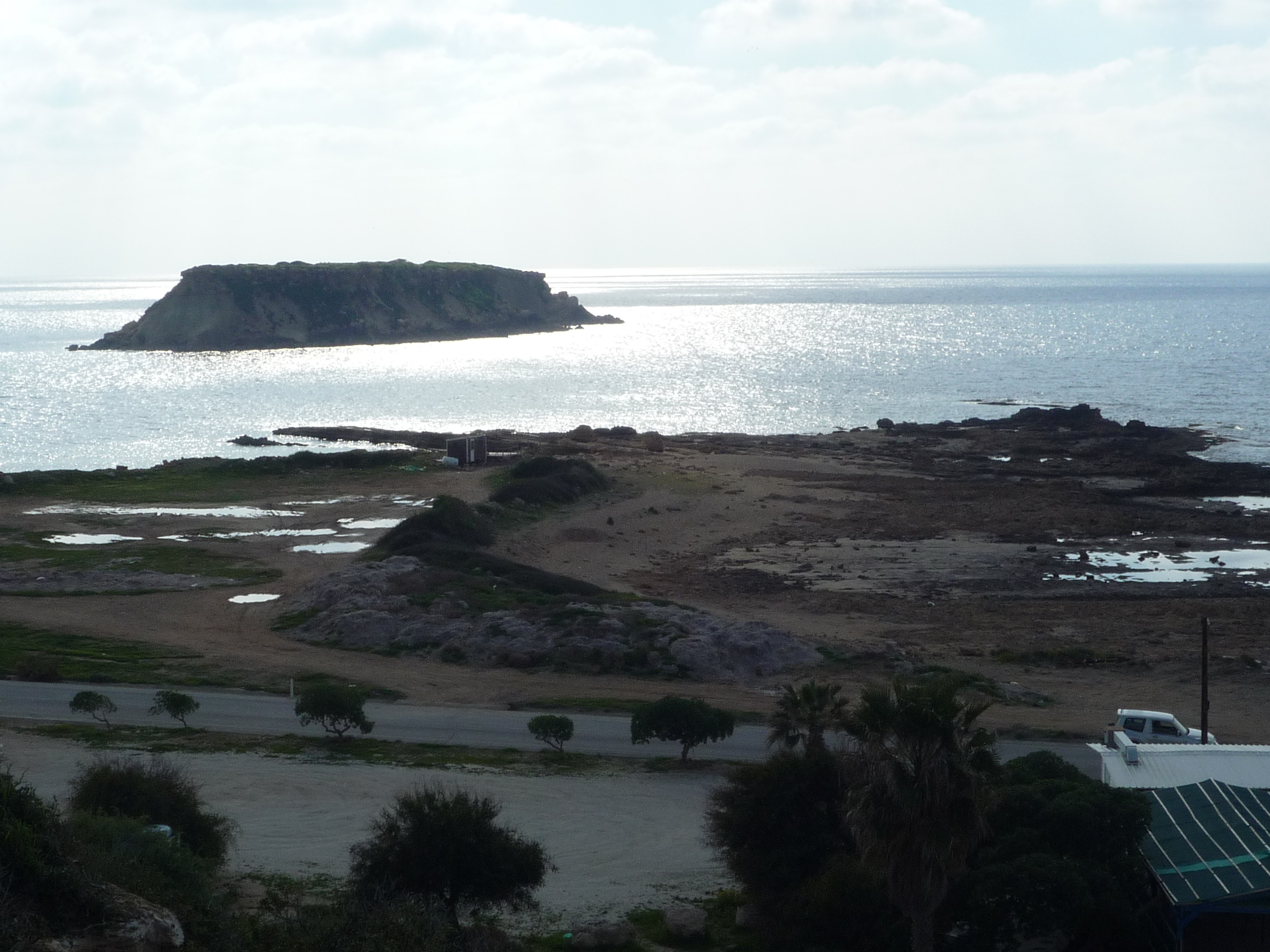
Yeronisos, an uninhabited island off the coast of Pegeia

=== History ===
The town's name is said to derive from the Latin word Baia ("Bay") due to its close proximity to Coral Bay, which served as a natural dock for Ancient Egyptian cargo vessels. The village was first settled by Venetians during the era of Venetian Cyprus which began in 1489, probably by merchant sailors and/or sailors of the Venetian fleet in conflict with the Ottoman Empire over rule of Cyprus. The beginning of Ottoman Cyprus in 1571 saw the relationship between the Eastern Orthodox and the Ottomans healthier than in comparison with the Catholic and Ottomans, resulting in many of the Venetian settlements on the island such as Pegeia assimilating into the Greek Cypriot and Orthodox Christian way of life.

In the past, villagers had to collect their water from the local spring (the "vrisi"). It was here that everyone met, especially the young men of the village, who would congregate to watch the young women collecting water in their red clay pitchers. Local folklore stated that drinking from the spring made girls beautiful, and several songs were written about it, one of which ("Spring of Pegeia Woman") is still sung today. The spring is still visible but is now seldom visited except by newlyweds, as a great number of wedding ceremonies are conducted nearby.

=== Modern Times ===
The local variety of the Cypriot Greek dialect in this region is notable for its melodic and fluctuating tone, resembling an Italian way of speech more than a Cypriot one, which is even more noticeable amongst older people.

The town's former football team, APOP Kinyras Peyias FC, played in the Cypriot First Division but dissolved after bankruptcy in 2012. Its current football team is Peyia 2014, which competes in the Cypriot Second Division.

Pegeia is home to a notably large percentage of British people and a growing number of holiday homes and apartments. It has a town hall, church, and police station alongside several small bakeries, bank branches, butchers, cafés, restaurants, and shops. It also has a local fish market and a large Phillipos supermarket. Due to its hillside location, many parts of the town offer views over Coral Bay and Paphos. It covers a large area, stretching from the Pegeia Forest on the hills above the town in the north to the Mediterranean Sea in the south, and from the Akamas Peninsula in the west to Coral Bay in the east.

== In popular culture ==
Pegeia received mainstream media attention in 2019 when Colombian singer Shakira and Spanish footballer Gerard Piqué, who were in a relationship at the time, purchased a villa in the region together.

The romantic comedy Find Me Falling (2024), which became the first Cypriot production to premiere on Netflix, was filmed largely in the town.

The 2026 Candidates Tournament, which determined the challenger for the World Chess Championship, was held at Pegeia's Cap St Georges Hotel and Resort between 28 March and 16 April 2026.

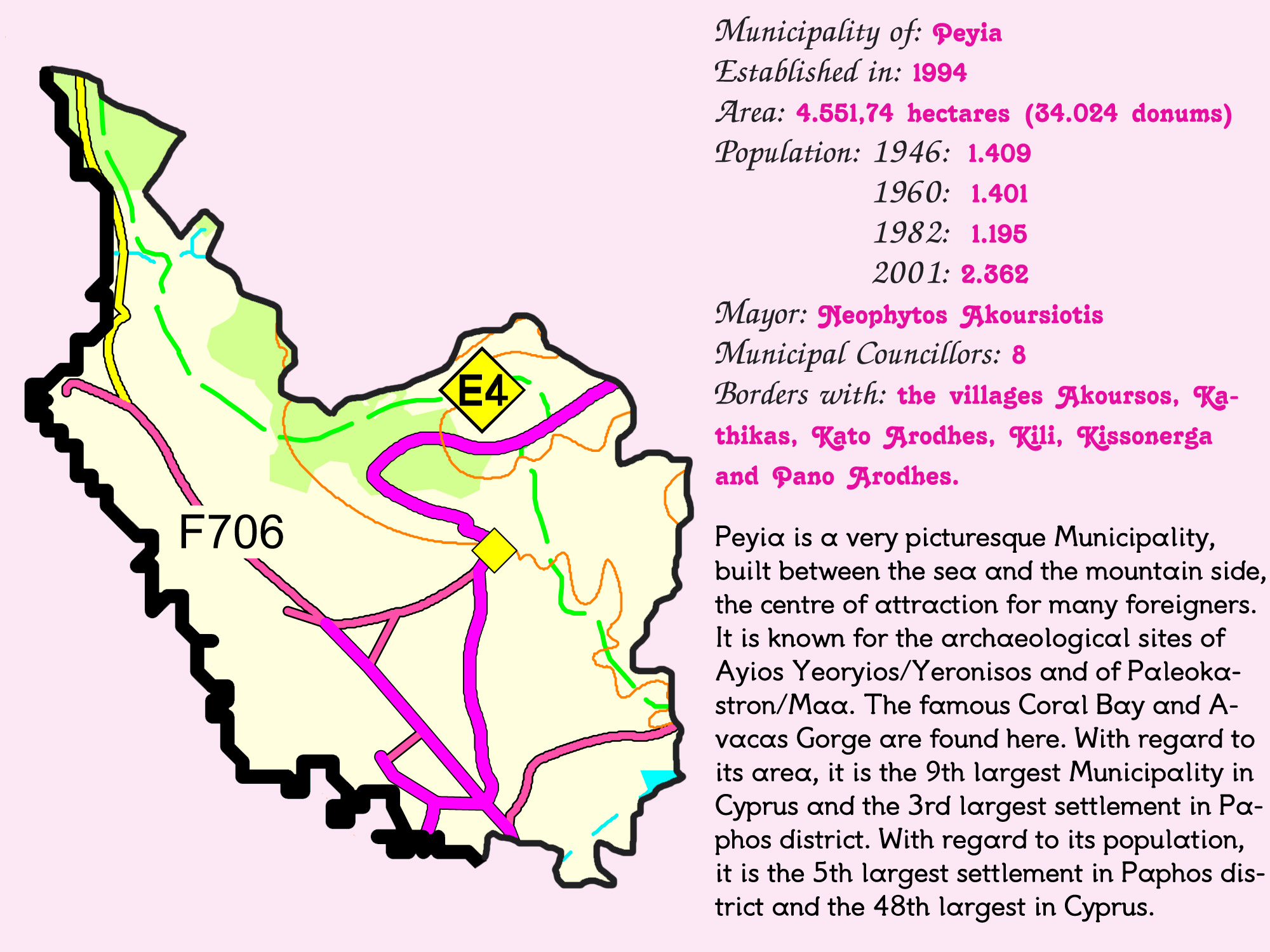
Concise presentation of Pegeia

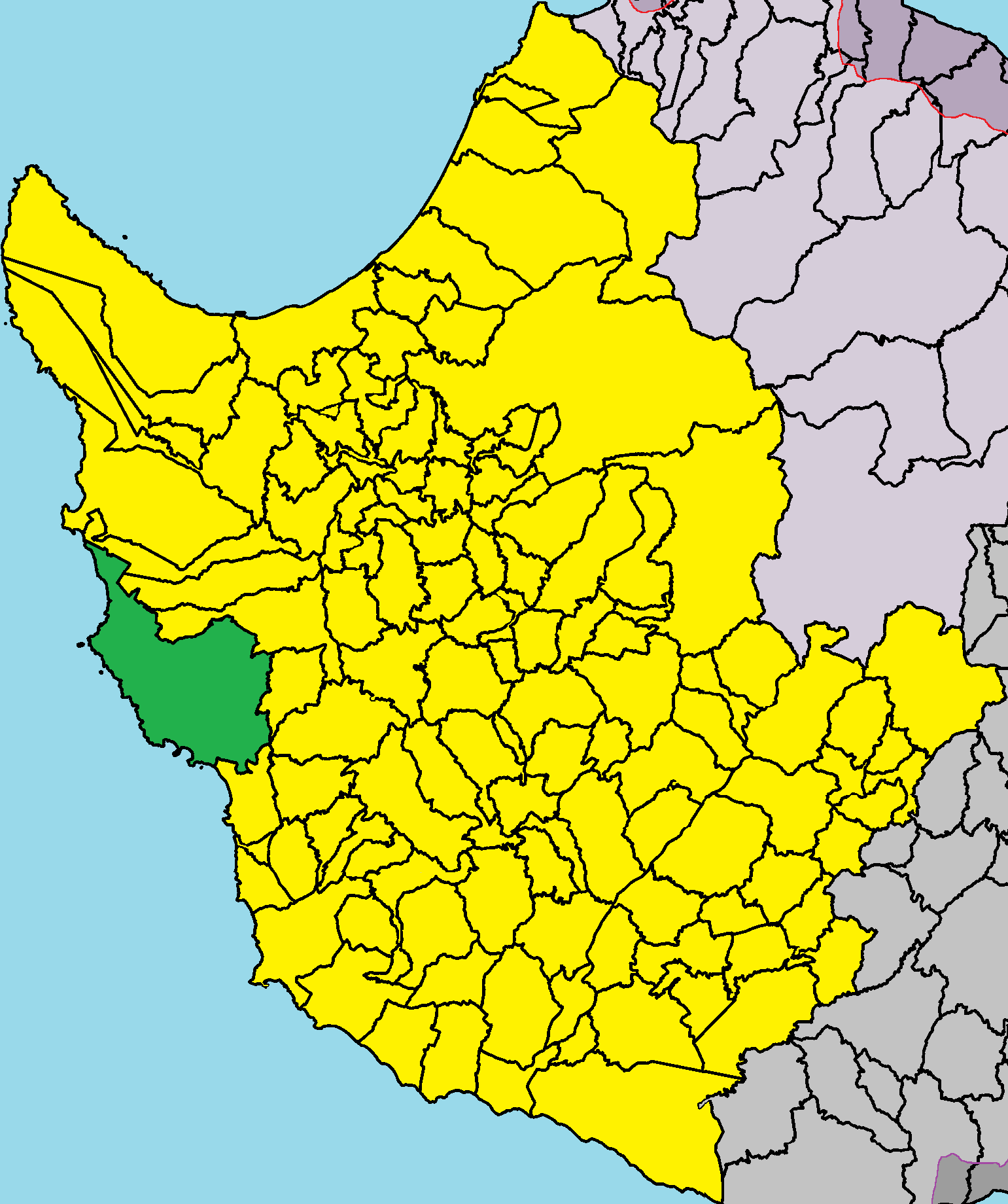
Location of the municipality of Pegeia within the district of Paphos

== Climate ==
=== Overview ===
Pegeia in general has a hot climate. The day temperatures range from 16 °C (61 °F) in January to 32 °C (89 °F) in August. The least rainy month in Pegeia is July with its 0 days of rain, and the rainiest month is January, when it rains 11 days. The highest night temperatures may be experienced in August with 21 °C (69 °F), and the lowest in February with 7 °C (45 °F). The highest sea temperatures in Pegeia are in August with 28 °C (82 °F) and the lowest are in February with 16 °C (61 °F).

=== January ===
Daily high temperatures are around 15°C, rarely falling below 12°C or exceeding 19°C. The lowest daily average high temperature is 15°C on January 24.

Daily low temperatures are around 7°C, rarely falling below 3°C or exceeding 11°C. The lowest daily average low temperature is 7°C on January 23.

For reference, on August 8, the hottest day of the year, temperatures in Pegeia typically range from 21°C to 30°C, while on January 23, the coldest day of the year, they range from 7°C to 15°C.

Climate data for Pegeia, Cyprus (241 m)
Month	Jan	Feb	Mar	Apr	May	Jun	Jul	Aug	Sep	Oct	Nov	Dec	Year
Mean daily maximum °C (°F)	15.7 (60.3)	16.0 (60.8)	17.7 (63.9)	20.9 (69.6)	24.8 (76.6)	29.1 (84.4)	31.6 (88.9)	32.0 (89.6)	29.6 (85.3)	25.9 (78.6)	21.7 (71.1)	17.6 (63.7)	23.6 (74.4)
Mean daily minimum °C (°F)	7.4 (45.3)	7.3 (45.1)	8.3 (46.9)	10.4 (50.7)	13.9 (57.0)	17.5 (63.5)	19.7 (67.5)	20.1 (68.2)	17.9 (64.2)	15.1 (59.2)	11.8 (53.2)	8.9 (48.0)	13.2 (55.7)
Source: Climate-Data.org
