= Kato Arodes =

Coordinates: 34°56′26″N 32°24′08″E

Arodes
- Interactive map of Arodes
- Country: Cyprus
- District: Paphos District

Population (2011)
  - Total: 39
- Time zone: UTC+2 (EET)
  - Summer (DST): UTC+3 (EEST)

Kato Arodes (Greek: Κάτω Αρόδες) is a village in the North West of Cyprus close to the Akamas peninsula. It is about 23 km from the town of Paphos.

In 1975 (a year after the Turkish invasion of Cyprus), Kato Arodes was abandoned and many of the buildings fell into disrepair. Some houses have now been renovated and made into holiday homes on the provision they be returned to their rightful owners in case of a settlement in the Cyprus dispute. Most residents of Kato Arodes moved to Kapouti (known as Kalkanli by Turkish Cypriots) to the north of the island.
