= Inia, Paphos =

Ineia Ίνεια
- Location in Cyprus
- Coordinates: 34°57′19″N 32°23′37″E
- Country: Cyprus
- District: Paphos District

Area
  - Total: 36.0324 km^{2} (13.9122 sq mi)
- Elevation: 605 m (1,985 ft)
- Highest elevation: 667 m (2,188 ft)
- Lowest elevation: 0 m (0 ft)

Population (2011)
  - Total: 385
  - Density: 9.35/km^{2} (24.2/sq mi)
- Time zone: UTC+2 (EET)
  - Summer (DST): UTC+3 (EEST)
- Postal code: 6352

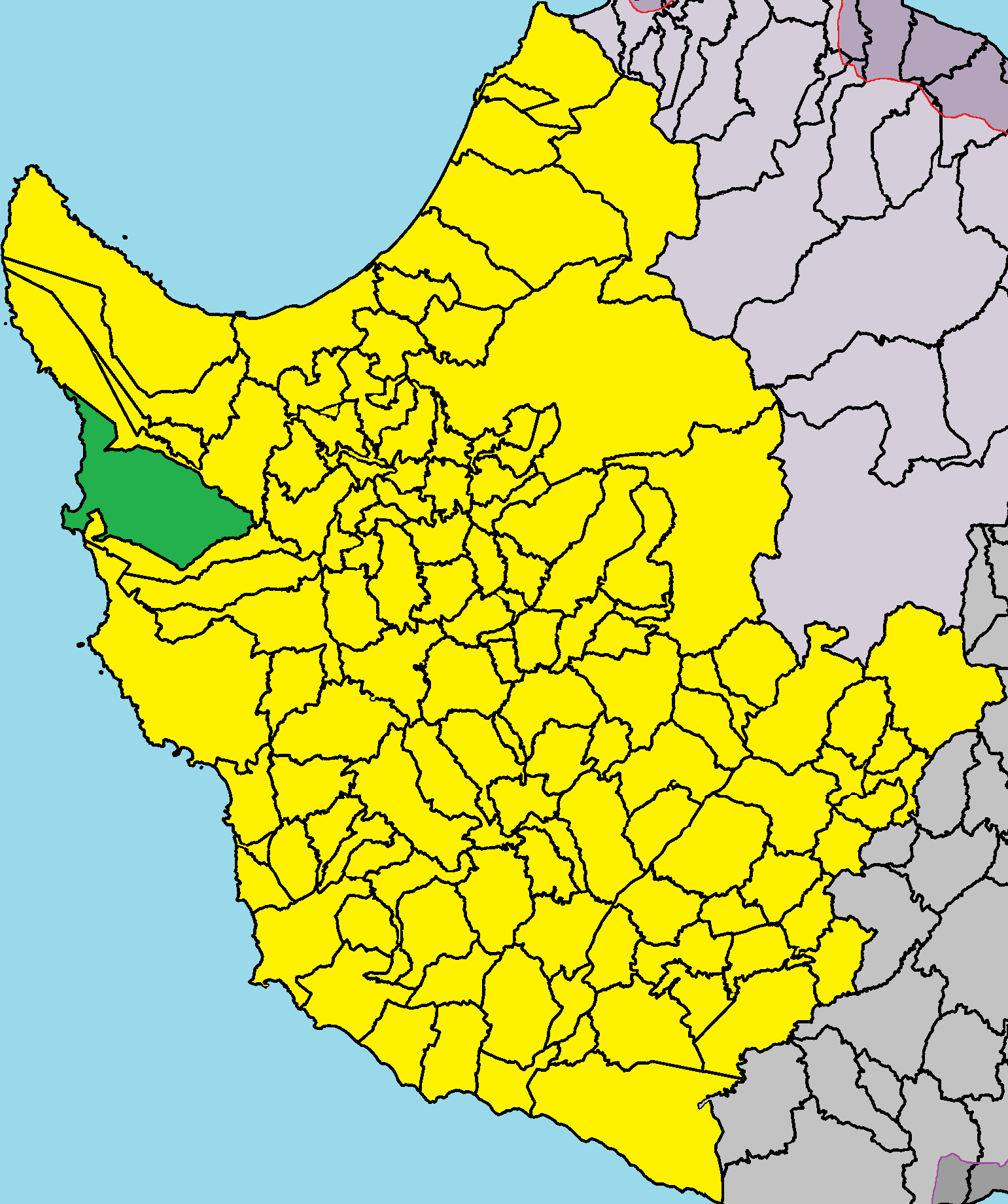
Inia, Paphos in Paphos District.

Ineia (Greek: Ίνεια) is a village in the Paphos District of Cyprus, located 1 km south of Dhrousha.

== Topography ==
Inia is located 625 m above sea level. It has 385 residents. Annual rainfall is 610 mm.

== Transportation ==
Located in the Pafos (Paphos) region, the village of Ineia sits on the mountainous area of Laona and overlooks the Akamas Peninsula. Located 30 km north of Pafos, Ineia can be reached by following either the B7 route and then the E711, or taking the E709 and then the F708.

== Naming ==
Ineia is believed to derive from the Latin "Vinea Engadi" which was a vineyard belonging to the Knights Hospitaller, who purchased it from the Knights Templar as suggested by Ludolf von Suchem on his tour to the island in 1350. The vineyards here produced Commandaria.

Ineia initially takes its name from the word "οίνος" - the word in the ancient Greek language for "wine" - while historical sources refer to it as "Wine" with the spelling of the name of the village gradually changing over time and taking the current form. Another theory is that Macedonian generals of Alexander found settlements similar to India, hence named it "India", which later changed to "Ineia".

== Climate ==
The average annual temperature is 16.6 °C.

Climate data for Inia, Cyprus (626 m)
Month	Jan	Feb	Mar	Apr	May	Jun	Jul	Aug	Sep	Oct	Nov	Dec	Year
Mean daily maximum °C (°F)	12.7 (54.9)	13.2 (55.8)	15.1 (59.2)	19.0 (66.2)	23.4 (74.1)	27.9 (82.2)	30.7 (87.3)	31.1 (88.0)	27.9 (82.2)	23.8 (74.8)	19.2 (66.6)	14.7 (58.5)	21.6 (70.8)
Mean daily minimum °C (°F)	5.4 (41.7)	5.2 (41.4)	6.2 (43.2)	8.9 (48.0)	12.6 (54.7)	16.5 (61.7)	18.6 (65.5)	19.3 (66.7)	16.5 (61.7)	13.4 (56.1)	10.0 (50.0)	6.8 (44.2)	11.6 (52.9)
Average precipitation mm (inches)	136 (5.4)	94.9 (3.74)	67.1 (2.64)	33 (1.3)	11 (0.4)	1.7 (0.07)	0.8 (0.03)	0.2 (0.01)	3.3 (0.13)	41 (1.6)	81 (3.2)	140 (5.5)	610 (24.0)
Average relative humidity (%)	77	75	70	62	55	49	49	53	56	59	67	76	63
Source: Cyprus Department of Meteorology
