= Kathikas =

Kathikas Κάθηκας
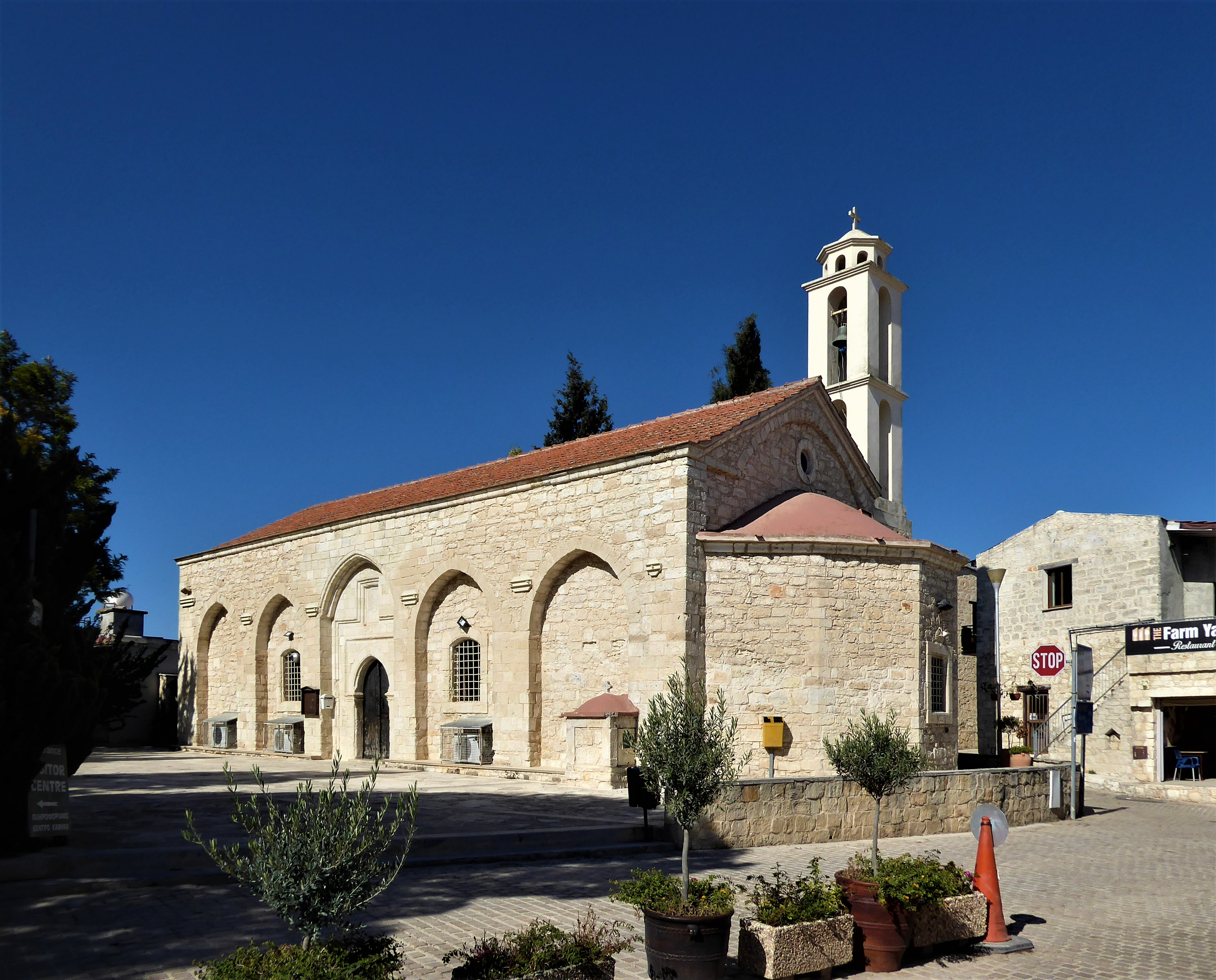

- Location in Cyprus
- Coordinates: 34°54′45″N 32°25′32″E
- Country: Cyprus
- District: Paphos District
- Elevation: 655 m (2,149 ft)
- Highest elevation: 683 m (2,241 ft)

Population (2011)
  - Total: 438
- Time zone: UTC+2 (EET)
  - Summer (DST): UTC+3 (EEST)

Kathikas (Greek: Κάθηκας) is one of the Laona villages in the Paphos District of Cyprus. It is situated on a plateau 23 kilometers north of Paphos. It has an altitude of 655m and a population of 333. It is well known for its grape production, such as xynisteri grapes. It also has a flourishing agrotourism industry.

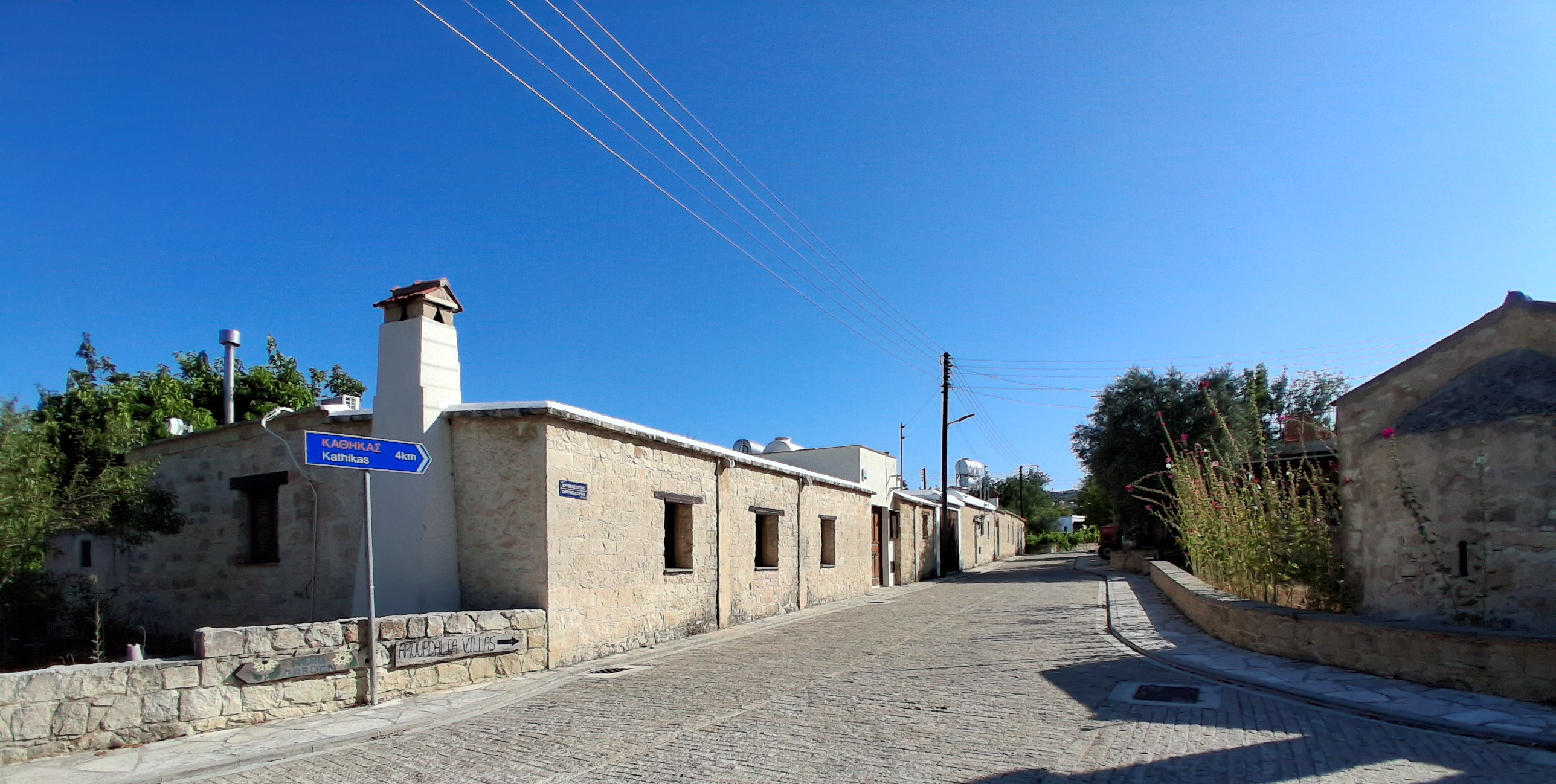
sign pointing to the town Kathikas

Kathikas has a very active Residents Association Additionally, Kathikas has residences that are over a century old and serve as examples of folkloric architecture.

== Landmarks ==
Avakas Gorge is a natural attraction.

The ruins of the abandoned village of Old Theletra. The inhabitants of Theletra were moved in the 1980s due to fears over landslides.

== Notable Kathikians ==
- Kypros Chrysostomides, politician and member of the Cypriot parliament, was born in Kathikas
- Kyriacos Mavronikolas, defence minister in the Tassos Papadopoulos government, was born in Kathikas
- George Georghiou, former director of Cyprus Airways and former secretary to the Council of Ministers. He is currently the Permanent Secretary of the Planning Bureau of Cyprus. Mr Georghiou was born in Kathikas
- Andrew Demetriou, chief executive officer of the Australian Football League – his mother was born in Kathikas
- George Taramides, well-known Cypriot dentist, inserted the first dental implant on the island. His vision made reality the creation of the Church of Ayios Ipatios in Kathikas. He is the author of the book "Avakas Gorge: A travelogue."
- Galatia Taramidou, aunt of Dr. George Taramides (1924–2009), former actor member of the Cyprus craft union which staged a variety plays at Magical Palace theatre in Nicosia. She played the protagonist in "Kiss Me Deadly", by Mickey Spillane.
- Dr. Xenophon Xenophontos, chief engineer of Cyprus Airways and a former member of the Cyprus Airways management committee.
- Eftichios Malekkides, corrupt former head of the Paphos Sewage Board. He was sentenced to 6 years gaol in 2015.

== Kathikas in the news ==
On April 7, 2000, a Kathikas man was arrested in connection with the theft of an ancient sarcophagus.

On February 24, 2007, the residents of Kathikas awoke to the news that two of the locals had been murdered.

== Annual events and celebrations ==
- 25 March – Feast Day of the church of Panayia Evangelistrais
- 31 March – Feast Day of Ayios Ipatios
- 12 June – Feast Day of Ayios Ounoufrios
- 17 July – Feast Day of Ayia Marina
- August – Festival of the Grapes
