= Dhrousha =

Dhrousha Δρούσια
- Location in Cyprus
- Coordinates: 34°57′41″N 32°23′51″E
- Country: Cyprus
- District: Paphos District
- Elevation: 620 m (2,030 ft)
- Highest elevation: 651 m (2,136 ft)
- Lowest elevation: 0 m (0 ft)

Population (2001)
  - Total: 386
- Time zone: UTC+2 (EET)
  - Summer (DST): UTC+3 (EEST)
- Postal code: 8700
- Area code: 6353
- Annual Rainfall: 613 mm

Dhrousha (Greek: Δρούσια) is a village in the Paphos District of Cyprus, located 10km south of Polis Chrysochous. It is located 620m above sea level. It receives about 613mm of annual rainfall. The average annual temperature is 16.6°C.

Drousia (or Drouseia or Droushia), one of the smallest villages in the mountainous area of Paphos, built at the highest point of the plateau of Laona, is located on the western side of the island.

The settlement seems to have taken its name from the word “drosia” (meaning "coolness", temperature-wise, in Greek), since because of its altitude and its relatively short distance from Akamas, it remains a cool destination even during the summer months.

Climate data for Drouseia, Cyprus (611 m)
Month	Jan	Feb	Mar	Apr	May	Jun	Jul	Aug	Sep	Oct	Nov	Dec	Year
Mean daily maximum °C (°F)	12.8 (55.0)	13.3 (55.9)	15.2 (59.4)	19.1 (66.4)	23.4 (74.1)	28 (82)	30.9 (87.6)	31.1 (88.0)	27.9 (82.2)	23.9 (75.0)	19.3 (66.7)	14.8 (58.6)	21.6 (70.9)
Mean daily minimum °C (°F)	5.5 (41.9)	5.2 (41.4)	6.3 (43.3)	8.9 (48.0)	12.5 (54.5)	16.5 (61.7)	18.7 (65.7)	19.2 (66.6)	16.4 (61.5)	13.5 (56.3)	10.0 (50.0)	6.9 (44.4)	11.6 (52.9)
Average precipitation mm (inches)	139 (5.5)	94.9 (3.74)	67.1 (2.64)	33 (1.3)	11 (0.4)	1.7 (0.07)	0.8 (0.03)	0.2 (0.01)	3.3 (0.13)	41 (1.6)	81 (3.2)	140 (5.5)	613 (24.1)
Average relative humidity (%)	77	75	70	62	55	49	49	53	56	59	67	76	63
Source: Cyprus Department of Meteorology

== Notable people ==
- Joseph of Vatopedi (1921–2009), monk at Mount Athos
