= Polis, Cyprus =

Polis Πόλη Χρυσοχούς, Πόλις Χρυσοχούς (Greek) Poli (Turkish)
- Town and Municipal District
- Polis Chrysochous
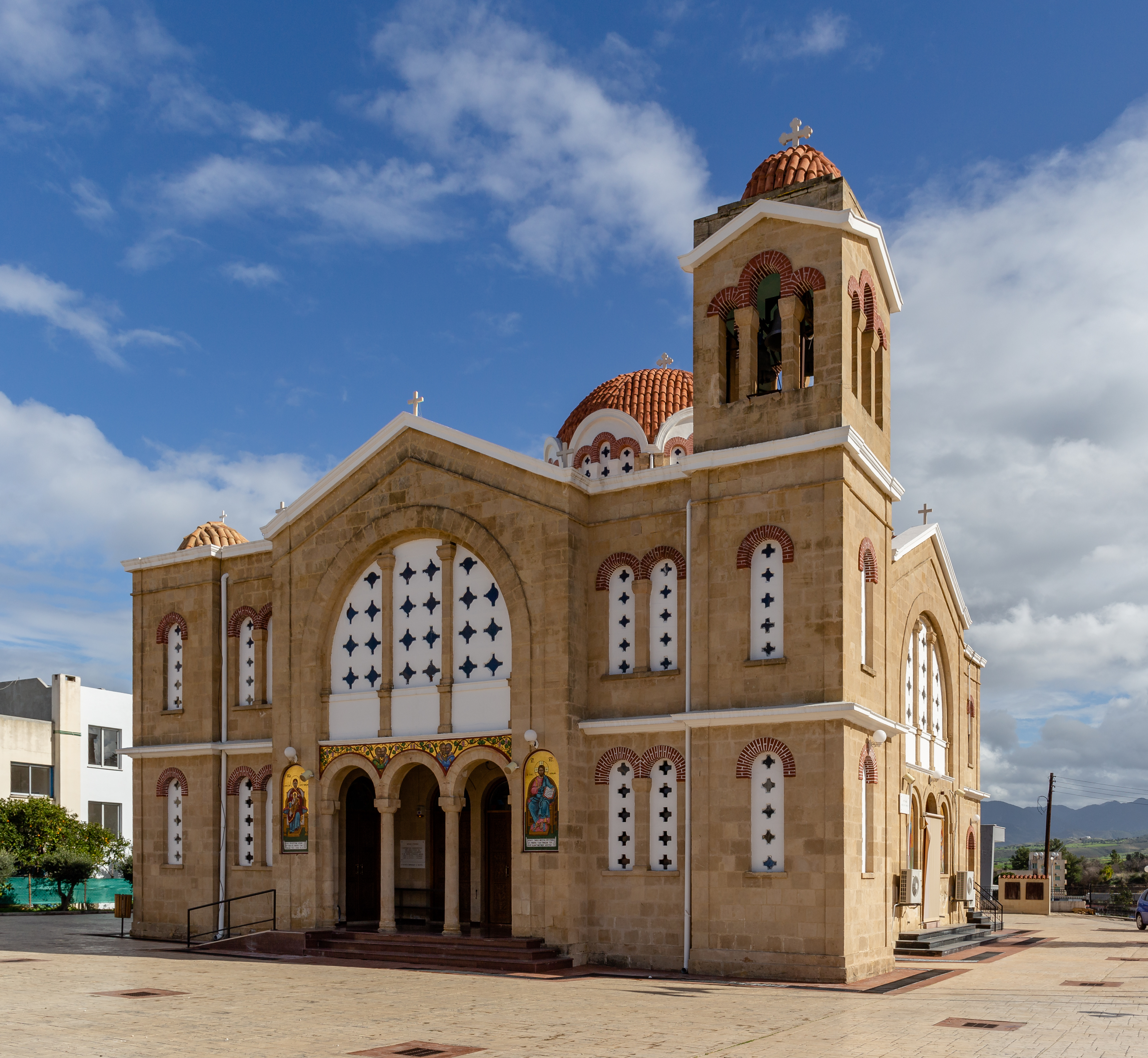

- Seal

- Location in Cyprus
- Coordinates: 35°2′0″N 32°26′0″E
- Country: Cyprus
- District: Paphos District
- Municipality: Polis Chrysochous Municipality

Population (2011)
  - Total: 3,690
- Time zone: UTC+2 (EET)
  - Summer (DST): UTC+3 (EEST)

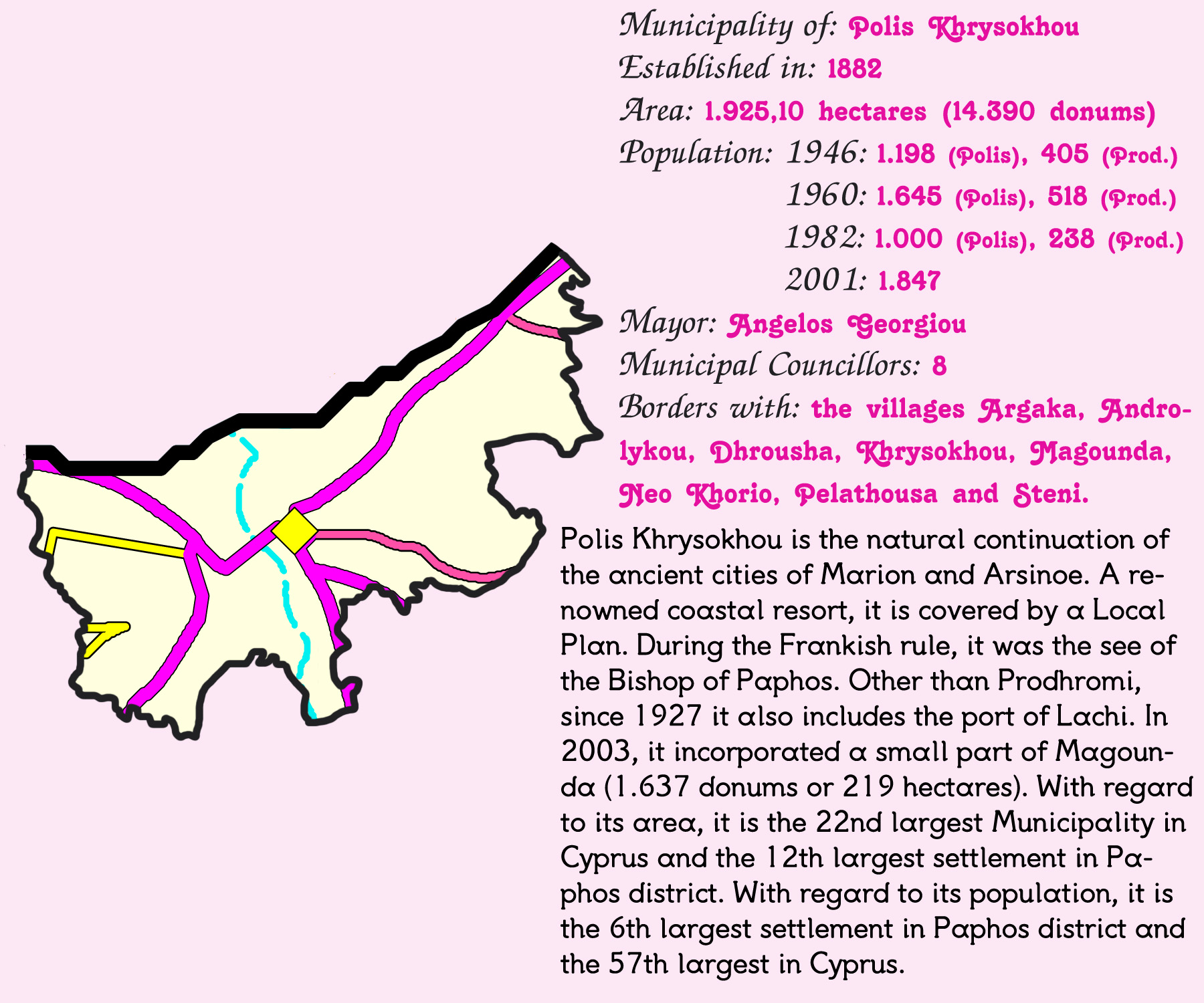
Concise presentation of Polis.

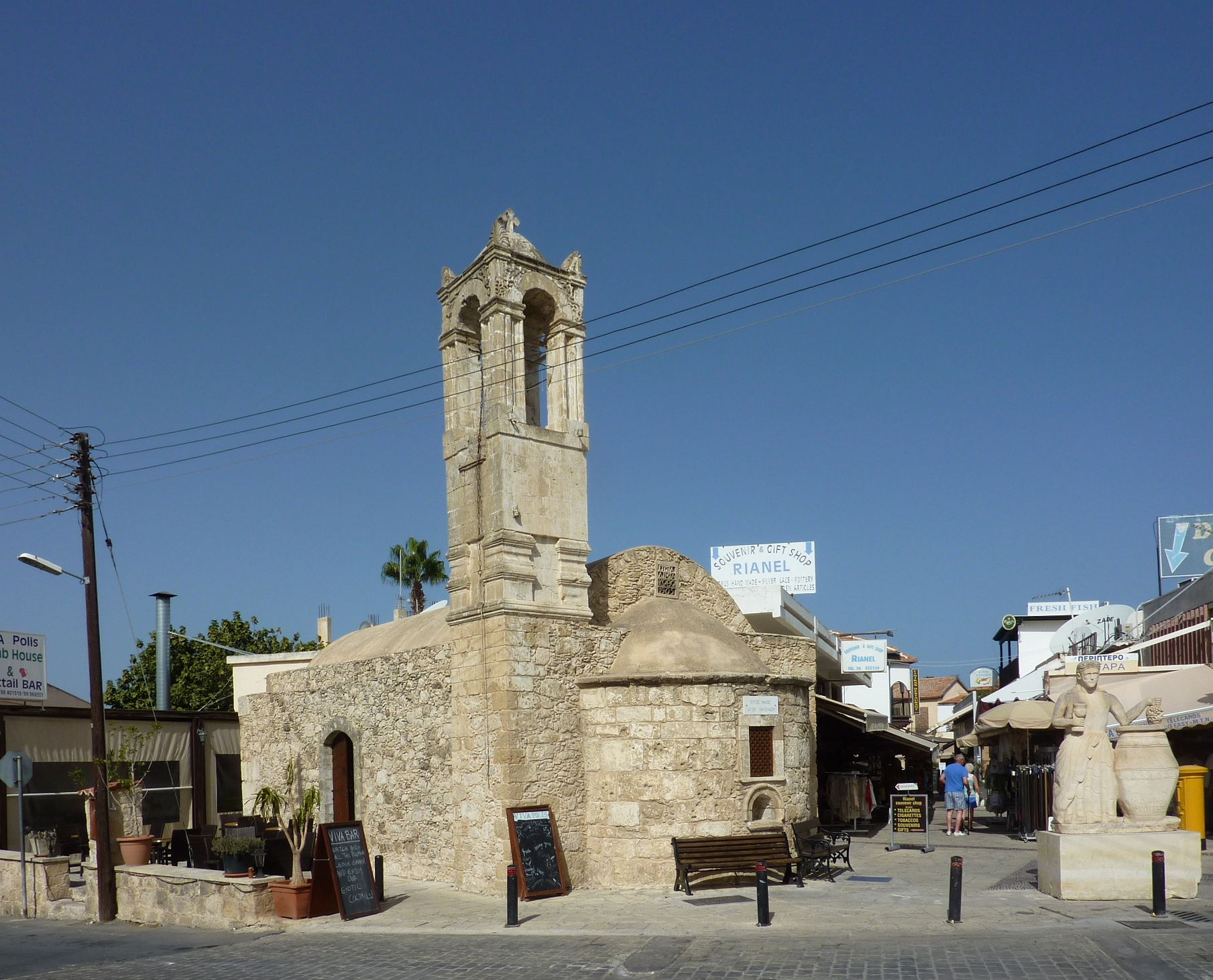
Agios Nikolaos church in town centre.

Polis (or Polis Chrysochous; Greek: Πόλη Χρυσοχούς or Πόλις Χρυσοχούς, Turkish: Poli) is a town and municipal district of the Polis Chrysochous municipality at the north-west end of the island of Cyprus, at the centre of Chrysochous Bay, and on the edge of the Akamas peninsula nature reserve.

Polis is served by the fishing port of Latchi.

== History ==
From the Ottoman period onwards, Polis became a mixed town, having sizeable Greek Cypriot and Turkish Cypriot communities. The 1831 census, which recorded only males, showed a total male population of 150 with a Turkish Cypriot majority. By the turn of the century, the Greek Cypriots had become the majority, with the 1891 census showing a population of 476 (258 Greek Cypriots, 218 Turkish Cypriots).

During the intercommunal violence of 1963–64, all Turkish Cypriots of Polis and the nearby village of Prodromi took refuge in the town's Turkish secondary school. 714 Turkish Cypriots lived in overcrowded conditions in a strip of land with the area of "a few hundred squared yards" until 1974. This enclave was controlled by fighters from the Turkish Resistance Organisation (TMT). During the conflict in 1974, the quarter was attacked by Greek Cypriot militia, after which the Turkish Cypriot fighters fled. Following the August 1974 ceasefire, some Turkish Cypriots of the village escaped to the north via the mountains. The rest were evacuated in 1975. Some displaced Greek Cypriots from the north were then resettled in Poli.

== Facilities ==
The Baths of Aphrodite and the recently discovered ruins of the medieval Georgian Orthodox monastery of Gialia are located near the town.

Nowadays, Polis is the administrative centre of the area which includes 23 communities. The larger communities include the villages of Prodromi, Latchi, and Neo Chorio to the West, and Argaka and Gialia to the East.

Facilities include a campsite on the beach, several small hotels, at least one of each type of shop, one branch of each major Cypriot bank, and many bars and restaurants mainly clustered around the town square and the pedestrianised streets to the south. A small bus station acts as the hub of a network of infrequent bus routes connecting the outer villages as well as the near hourly 645 route to Paphos.

Facilities further afield include boat hire and boat trips from Latchi harbour, nature trails and walks from Baths of Aphrodite, and surfing and windboarding at Argaka. An almost unbroken chain of beaches runs from Aphrodite in the west to Gialia in the east and range from busy tourist ones equipped with sunbeds and cafes to more remote ones only accessible by boat or 4WD vehicle.

The Municipality puts on cultural events including traditional dances and music outside the town hall during the summer months and arranges other fetes and festivals throughout the year.

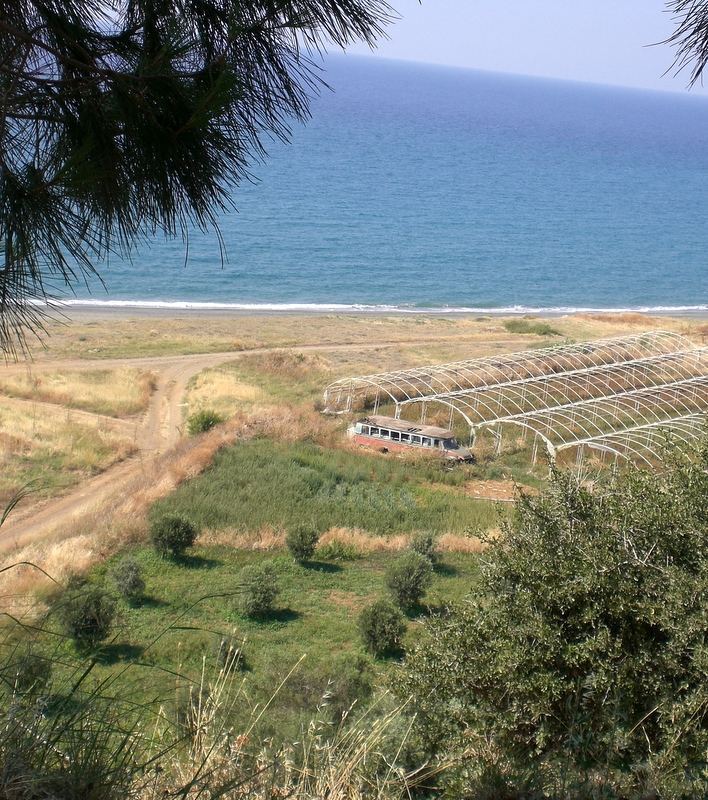
One of the many beaches of Polis.

== Name ==
The village where the town gets its full name from, Chrysochou, is located about 2 km (1.2 mi) inland to the south and the bay the whole region is located on is called Chrysochou bay. The Greek word "Polis" simply means city or city-state, so the town's full name, Polis Chrysochou, is derived from it being the administrative centre for the region. Chrysochou in turn derives its name from the Greek word "Chryso" meaning gold. Opinion is divided as to whether this is because the villages first settler was a goldsmith, or whether it was intended to mean prosperity in relation to the nearby copper mines as no source or record of gold is known in the vicinity.

== Climate ==
Climate data for Polis
| Month | Jan | Feb | Mar | Apr | May | Jun | Jul | Aug | Sep | Oct | Nov | Dec | Year |
|---|---|---|---|---|---|---|---|---|---|---|---|---|---|
| Mean daily maximum °C (°F) | 16.4 (61.5) | 16.3 (61.3) | 18.5 (65.3) | 21.5 (70.7) | 26.1 (79.0) | 30.5 (86.9) | 33.5 (92.3) | 33.3 (91.9) | 29.9 (85.8) | 26.5 (79.7) | 21.9 (71.4) | 17.8 (64.0) | 24.3 (75.7) |
| Daily mean °C (°F) | 12.1 (53.8) | 11.8 (53.2) | 13.5 (56.3) | 16.3 (61.3) | 20.4 (68.7) | 24.7 (76.5) | 27.6 (81.7) | 27.6 (81.7) | 24.6 (76.3) | 21.4 (70.5) | 17.2 (63.0) | 13.6 (56.5) | 19.2 (66.6) |
| Mean daily minimum °C (°F) | 7.9 (46.2) | 7.3 (45.1) | 8.6 (47.5) | 11.1 (52.0) | 14.7 (58.5) | 18.8 (65.8) | 21.6 (70.9) | 21.8 (71.2) | 19.3 (66.7) | 16.3 (61.3) | 12.4 (54.3) | 9.4 (48.9) | 14.1 (57.4) |
| Average precipitation mm (inches) | 79.9 (3.15) | 67.1 (2.64) | 37.6 (1.48) | 24.7 (0.97) | 7.20 (0.28) | 1.50 (0.06) | 0.20 (0.01) | 0.00 (0.00) | 4.40 (0.17) | 21.8 (0.86) | 55.3 (2.18) | 94.4 (3.72) | 394.2 (15.52) |
| Average precipitation days (≥ 1 mm) | 10.1 | 8.3 | 6.5 | 4.2 | 1.8 | 0.2 | 0.1 | 0.0 | 0.6 | 2.9 | 5.7 | 9.1 | 49.4 |
| Mean monthly sunshine hours | 192.2 | 211.7 | 254.2 | 291.0 | 359.6 | 387.0 | 399.9 | 378.2 | 318.0 | 279.0 | 219.0 | 182.9 | 3,472.7 |
Source: Meteorological Service (Cyprus)

== See also ==
- Abdul Kerim al-Qubrusi
- Akamas
