= 12th-century Byzantine domes =

The larger scale of some Byzantine buildings of the 12th century required a more stable support structure for domes than the four slender columns of the cross-in-square type could provide. The use of piers as part of large cruciform plans is documented, a practice that had been out of fashion for several centuries. A variant of the cross-in-square, the "so-called atrophied Greek cross plan", also provided greater support for a dome than the typical cross-in-square plan by using four piers projecting from the corners of an otherwise square naos, rather than four columns.

== Greece ==
The cross-in-square katholikon of Kaisariani Monastery in Athens was built from the end of the 11th to the beginning of the 12th centuries. Its central dome is supported on four marble pillars. A narthex with a lower central dome was added in the 16th or 17th century.

Other examples of 12th century cross-in-square churches include the Nikolaos chapel at Lavra monastery, the Church of Panagia Chalkeon in Thessaloniki, the Church of Panagia Kapnikarea in Athens, the Megali Panagia Monastery in Samos, the katholikon at Church of St George in Kolusha, Sagmata Monastery, the church of Agios Geōrgios in Keryneia, Agia Nikolaos in Elaiōnas, the Archangels chapel at Rila Monastery, Ai Kyr Giannēs in Alikianos, the church of Agia Dēmētrios on Crete, the church of Agia Iōannēs Prodromos in Schimatari, Agia Ioannes in Episkopi, Panagia church in Phodele, the Panagia church in Lambēnē, the katholikon of Zemen Monastery, the Church of St Demetrius in Patalenitsa, Monē Acheiropoiētou in Lambousa, Agios Geōrgios in Sōtēra, Panagia tis Angeloktistis, A. Filōn in Rizokarpaso, Metamorphōsis in Athens, Agios Petros in Kastania, Metamorphōsis in Nomitzi, Agios Sergios & Bakchos in Kitta, Agios Barbara in Latziana, the katholikon of Kaisariani Monastery, Gorgoepēkoos in Athens, Agios Iasōnas & Sōsipatros in Kerkyra, Agios Nikolaos in Arta, Panagia Episkopi, Panagia Agētria in Agia Kyriaki, Agios Nikolaos in Ochia, Agios Triada in Ligortys, Theotokos Kosmosoteira in Pherrai, Metamorphōsis in Amphissa, A. Iōannēs ho Theologos in Athens, katholikon of Panagia monastery, Zōodochos Pēgē in Samari, Taxiarches in Melida, Agios Ioannēs ho Eleēmōn in Lygourio, Taxiarchēs in Andros, and the Church of Saint Panteleimon in Gorno Nerezi.

The domed octagon Church of the Saviour in Chortiatis, near Thessaloniki, is dated to the middle of the 12th century and is similar to the Haghioi Apostoloi at Pyrgi.

The ruined church of Haghios Demetrios, near Haghios in northern Euboea, had a domed octagon design (or pseudo-octagon, given the narrow corner niches) dated to the 12th century.

The Panagia Krina on the island of Chios has a domed octagon design similar to that of the Nea Moni on the same island, but is dated to the 12th or 13th centuries.

== Constantinople ==
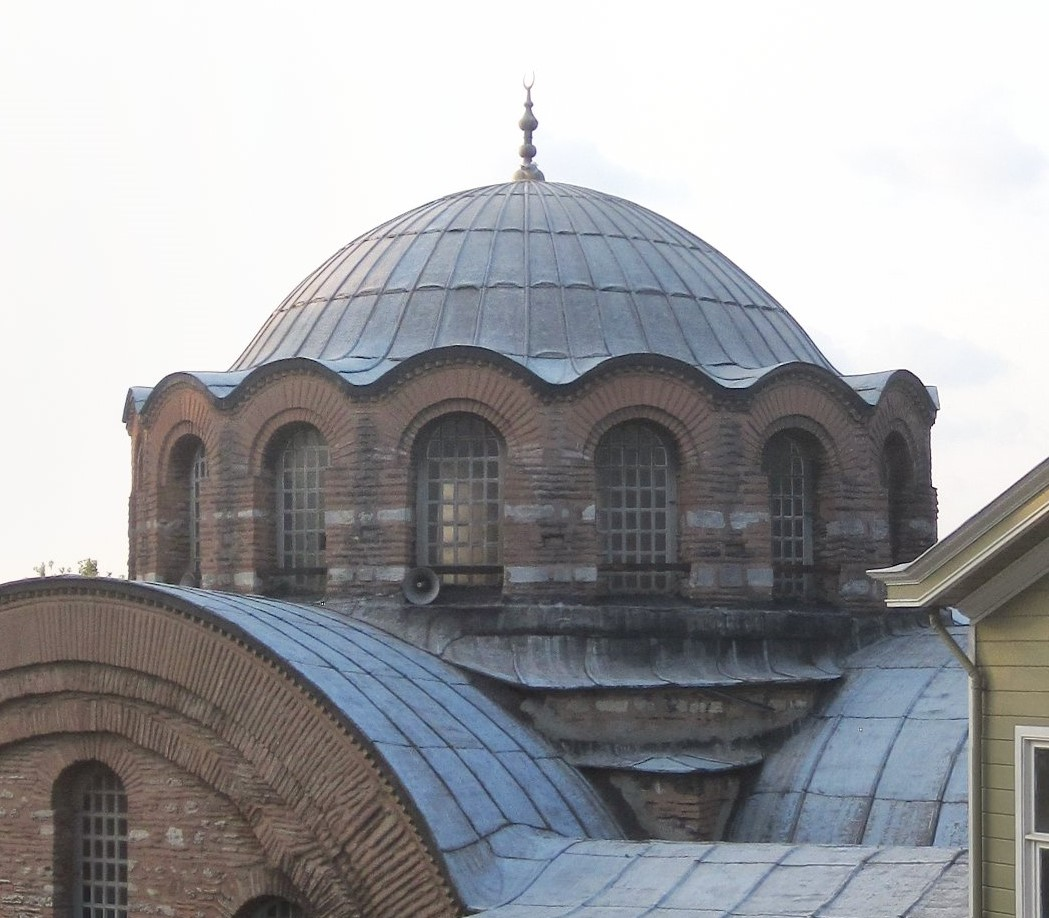
Kalenderhane Mosque in Istanbul

The Byzantine churches today called Kalenderhane Mosque, Gül Mosque, and the Enez Fatih mosque all had domes greater than 7 meters (23 ft) in diameter and used piers as part of large cruciform plans. The "so-called atrophied Greek cross plan" was used in the Chora Church of Constantinople in the 12th century after the previous cross-in-square structure was destroyed by an earthquake.

The 12th century Pantokrator monastic complex (1118–36) was built with imperial sponsorship as three adjoining churches. The south church, a cross-in-square, has a ribbed dome over the naos, domical vaults in the corners, and a pumpkin dome over the narthex gallery. The north church is also a cross-in-square plan. The middle church, the third to be built, fills the long space between the two earlier churches with two oval domes of the pumpkin and ribbed types over what appear to be separate functional spaces. The western space was an imperial mausoleum, whereas the eastern dome covered a liturgical space.

There is a written account by Nicholas Mesarites of a Persian-style muqarnas dome built as part of a late 12th century imperial palace in Constantinople. Called the "Mouchroutas Hall", it may have been built as part of an easing in tensions between the court of Manuel I Komnenos and Kilij Arslan II of the Sultanate of Rum around 1161, evidence of the complex nature of the relations between the two states. The account, written by Nicholas Mesarites shortly before the Fourth Crusade, is part of a description of the coup attempt by John Komnenos in 1200, and may have been mentioned as a rhetorical device to disparage him. The domed Mouchroutas was built next to the Byzantine throne room at the imperial palace while a Rum Seljuk prince was living there and may have been used as a reception hall.

== North Macedonia ==
An examples of a 12th century cross-in-square church is the Church of Saint Panteleimon in Gorno Nerezi.

== Cyprus ==
Examples of 12th century cross-in-square churches include the church of Agios Geōrgios in Keryneia, Monē Acheiropoiētou in Lambousa, Agios Geōrgios in Sōtēra, Panagia tis Angeloktistis, and A. Filōn in Rizokarpaso.

== Bulgaria ==
Examples of 12th century cross-in-square churches include the katholikon at Church of St George in Kolusha, the Archangels chapel at Rila Monastery, the katholikon of Zemen Monastery, and the Church of St Demetrius in Patalenitsa.

== Turkey ==
The Byzantine churches today called the Enez Fatih mosque had a dome greater than 7 meters (23 ft) in diameter and used piers as part of a large cruciform plan.

== See also ==
- List of Roman domes
- History of architecture
