= Dromolaxia–Meneou Municipality =

Dromolaxia–Meneou Municipality Δήμος Δρομολαξιάς-Μενεού
- Municipality
- Location in Cyprus
- Coordinates: 34°51′55″N 33°35′27″E
- Country: Cyprus
- District: Larnaca District
- Established: 1 July 2024

Government
  - Mayor: Kypros Andronikou

Population (2021)
  - Total: 17,026
- Time zone: UTC+2 (EET)
  - Summer (DST): UTC+3 (EEST)
- Website: dromolaxia-meneou.com.cy

Dromolaxia–Meneou Municipality (Greek: Δήμος Δρομολαξιάς-Μενεού) is a municipality of Larnaca District of Cyprus.

It is one of the five municipalities that were formed on 1 July 2024 following Local Government Reform, consolidating the former Municipality of Dromolaxia-Meneos (founded in 2011 after a referendum and consisting of two quarters, Dromolaxia and Meneou) and the former Communities of Kiti, Pervolia, and Tersefanou into the new municipality of the same name, transforming them into municipal districts.
