= Bey Hamam =

Turkish bathhouse in Greece

Coordinates: 40.6357°N 22.9453°E

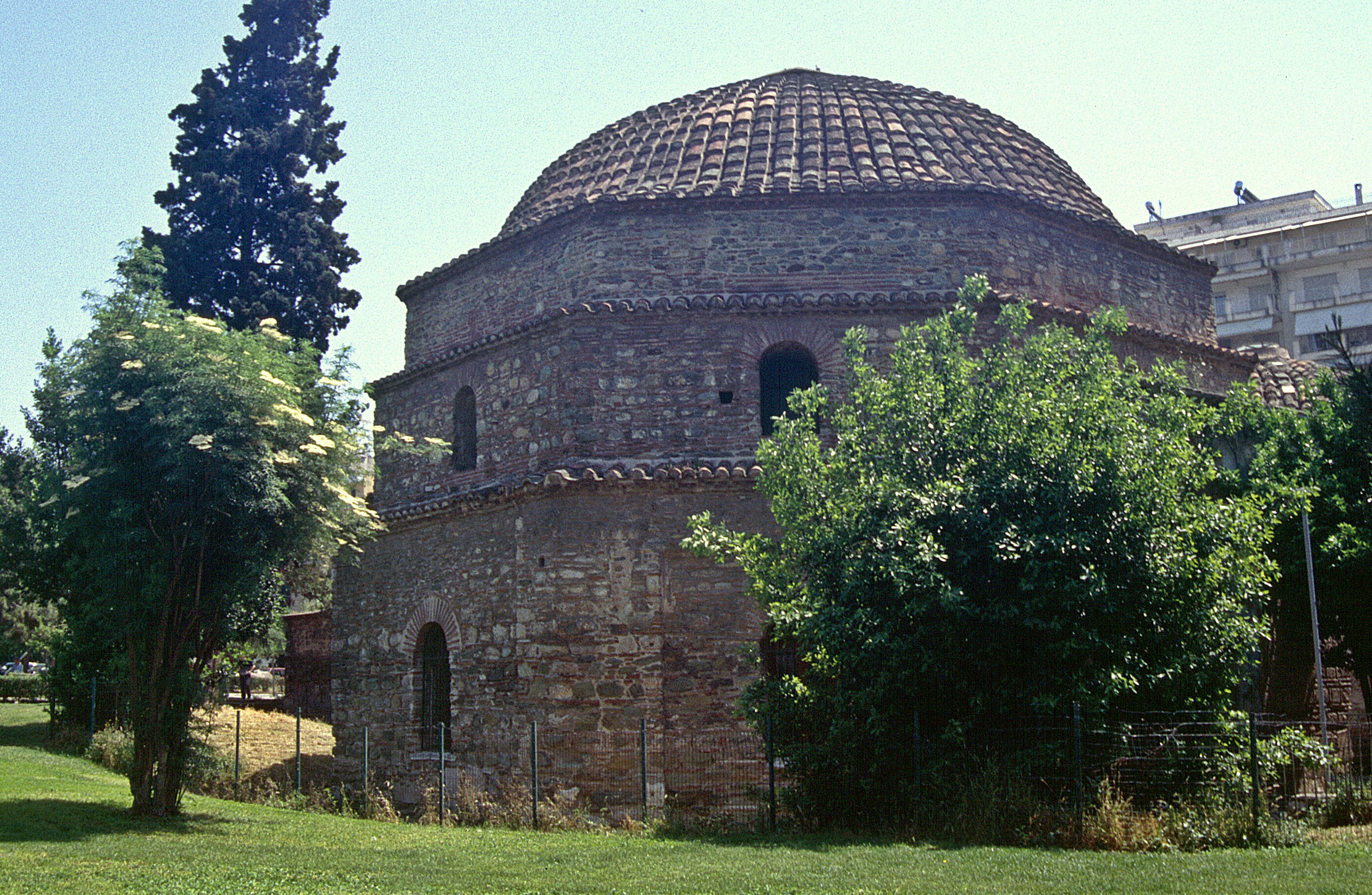
Bey Hamam seen from the outside

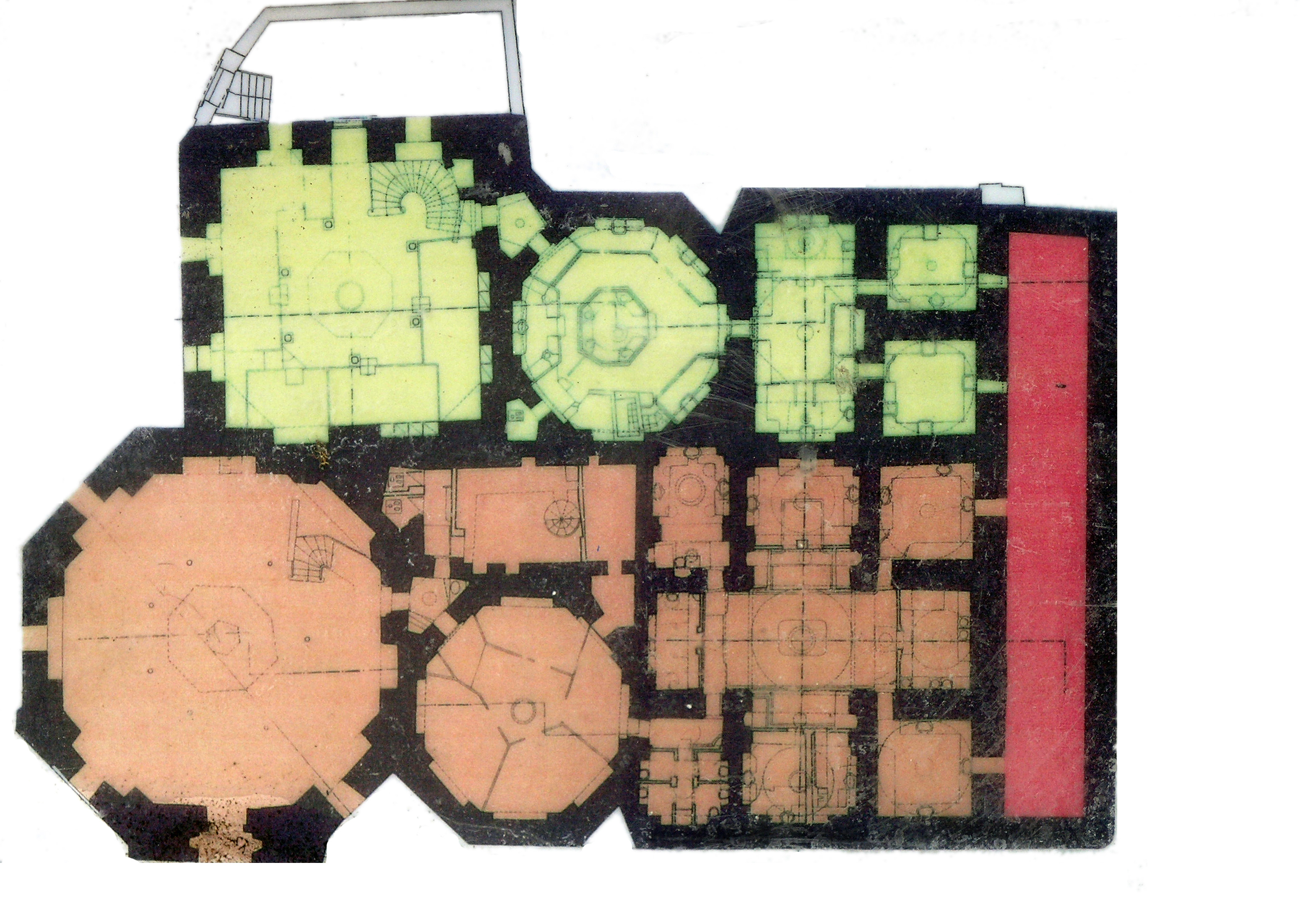
Floorplan of Bey Hamam

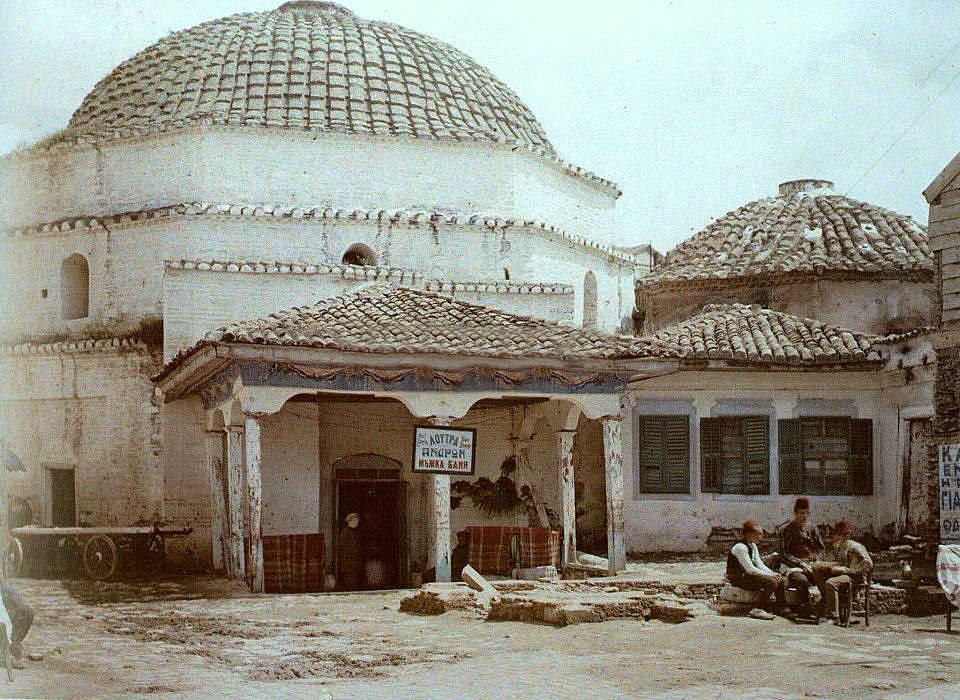
Photograph of Bey Hamam by Auguste Léon, circa 1913, shortly after the end of Ottoman rule. A sign on the main entrance reads "Men's Bath" in Greek and Bulgarian languages.

Bey Hamam, alternatively known as the "Baths of Paradise", is a Turkish bathhouse located along Egnatia Street in Thessaloniki, east of Panagia Chalkeon.

== History ==
Built in 1444 by sultan Murad II, it was the first Ottoman bath in Thessaloniki and the most important one still standing throughout Greece. For this reason, it is a part of those few important vestiges of Ottoman culture remaining in Thessaloniki and Greece in general.

It is a double bath, with two separate parts for men and women. The male quarters are the most spacious and luxurious, but each one follows the same tripartite plan - a succession of three parts, the cold, tepid, and hot rooms. A large rectangular cistern flanks the baths to the east and guarantees their water supply.

The baths for the men include a large octagonal cold room, with a gallery resting on columns, arcades surrounding their windows, and a painted cupola. It is followed, in south-east, by the tepid room, also octagonal, equipped with a cupola with occuli and with a rich series of painted depictions of plants. Further to the east lies the complex of hot rooms, ordered around a large cruciform room, wherein the massage table might always be found, standing, now as ever, in its centre. Eight small hot and tepid rooms open on this space and are equipped with basins and marble benches.

The baths remained in usage, under the name "Baths of Paradise", up until 1968, where they were leased to the Greek archaeological service for four years. After the 1978 Thessaloniki earthquake, which shook Thessaloniki especially hard, the baths were restored, and are used to this day for cultural events and short-lived exhibitions. Meanwhile, the eastern annex became the principal shop of the Foundation of Archaeological Receipts of the Hellenic Republic Ministry of Culture.

== Gallery ==
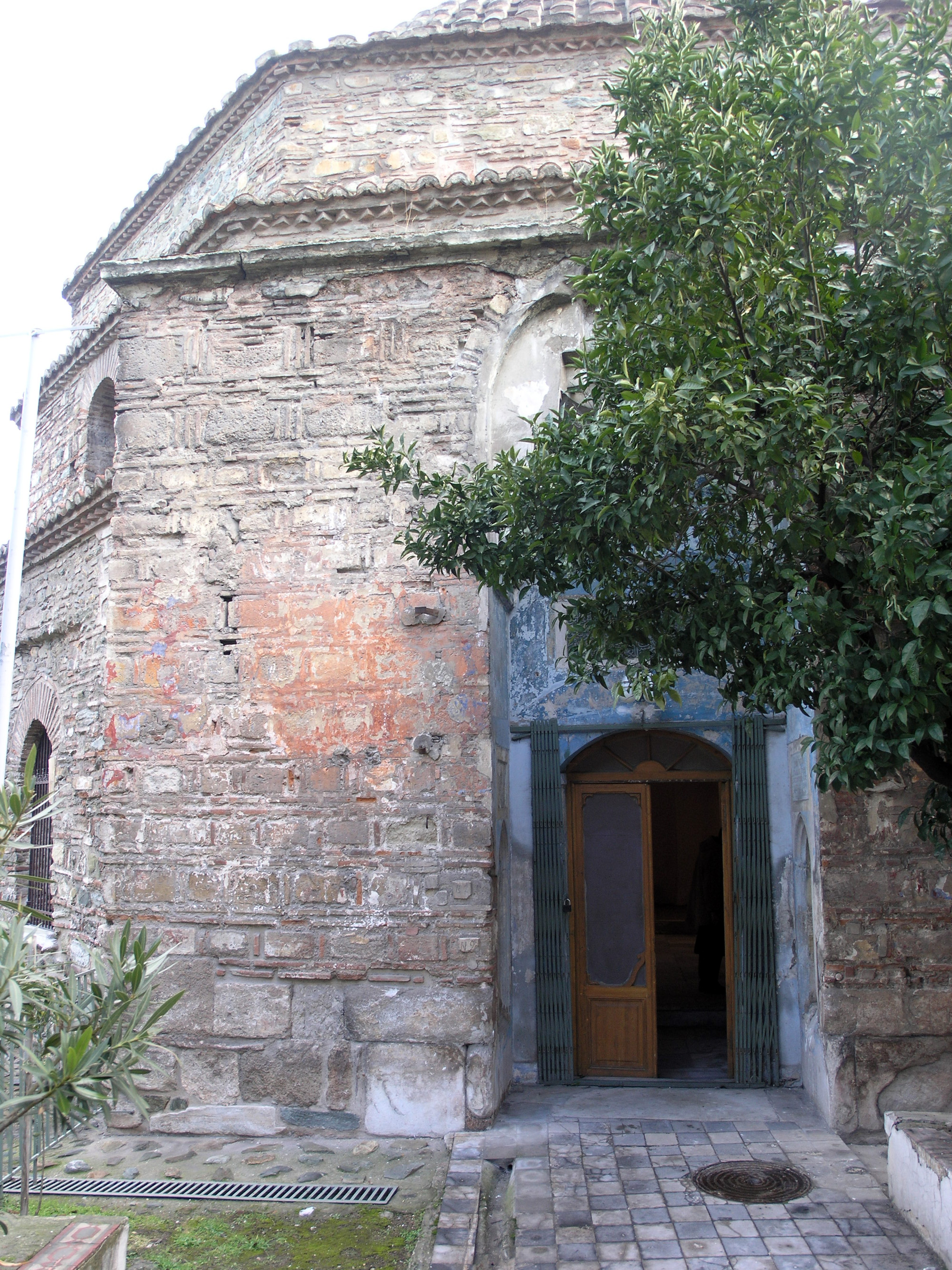
Entrance to the male quarter of the baths

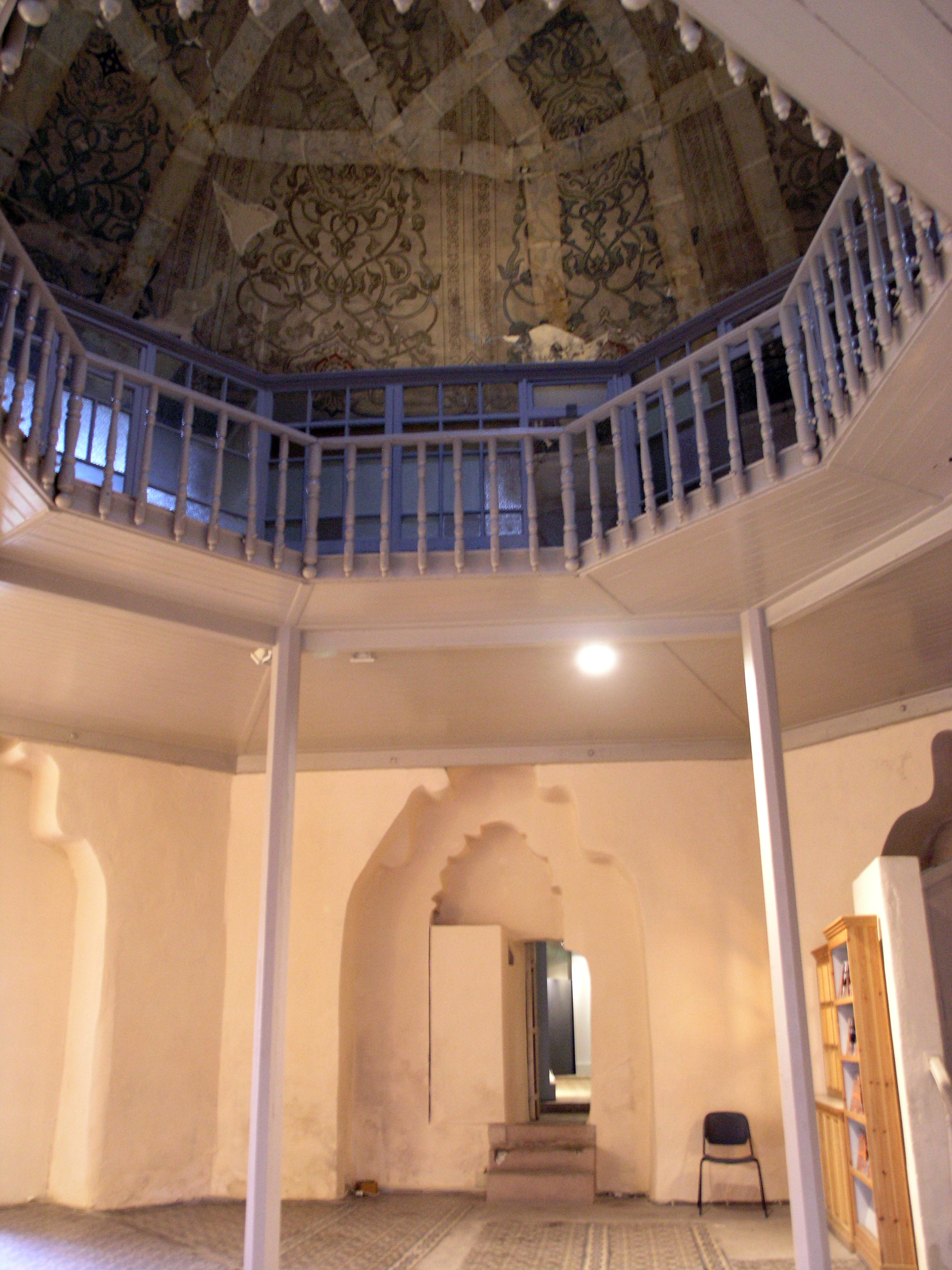
Cold room of the male quarter

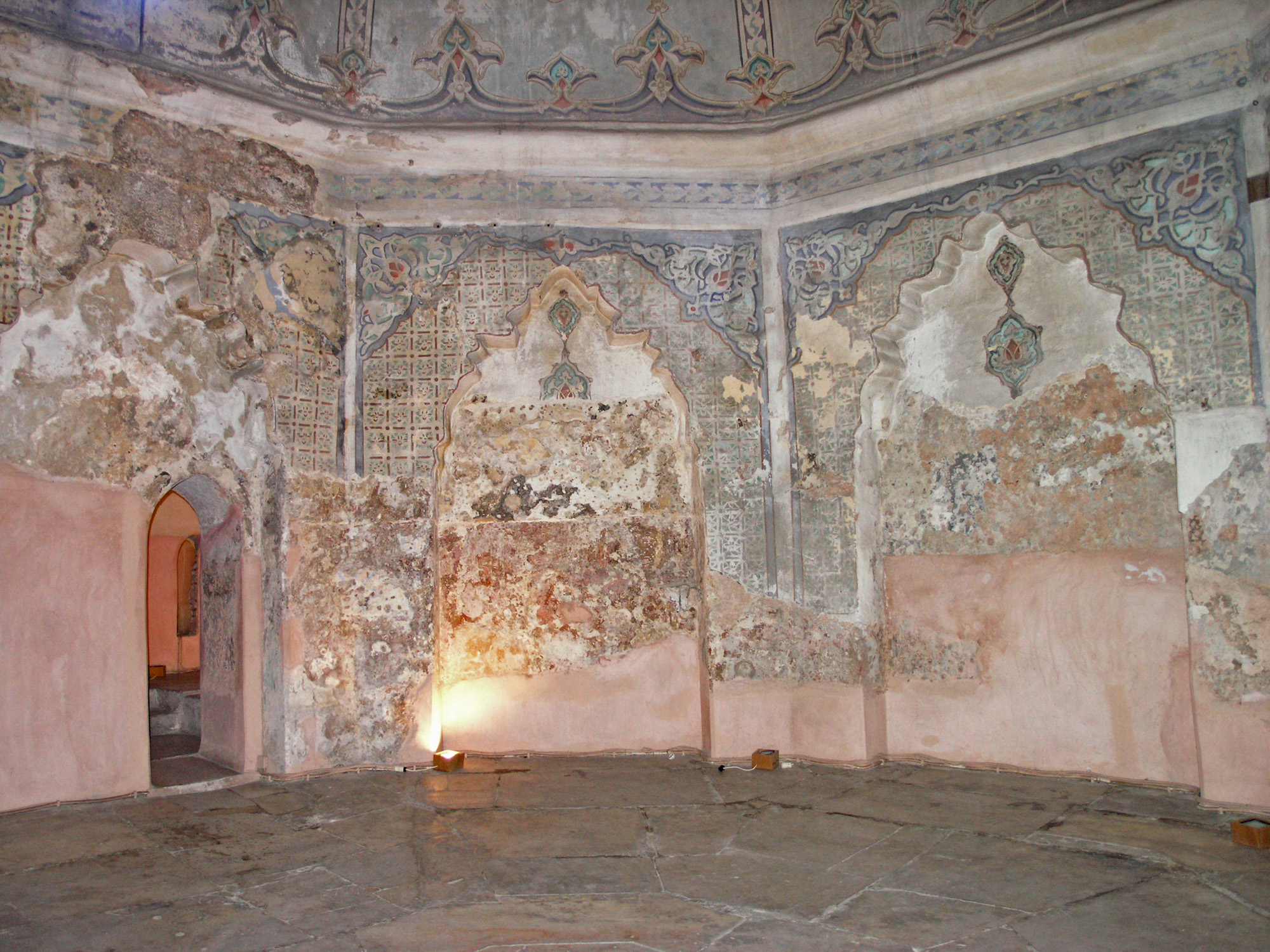
Tepid room of the male quarter

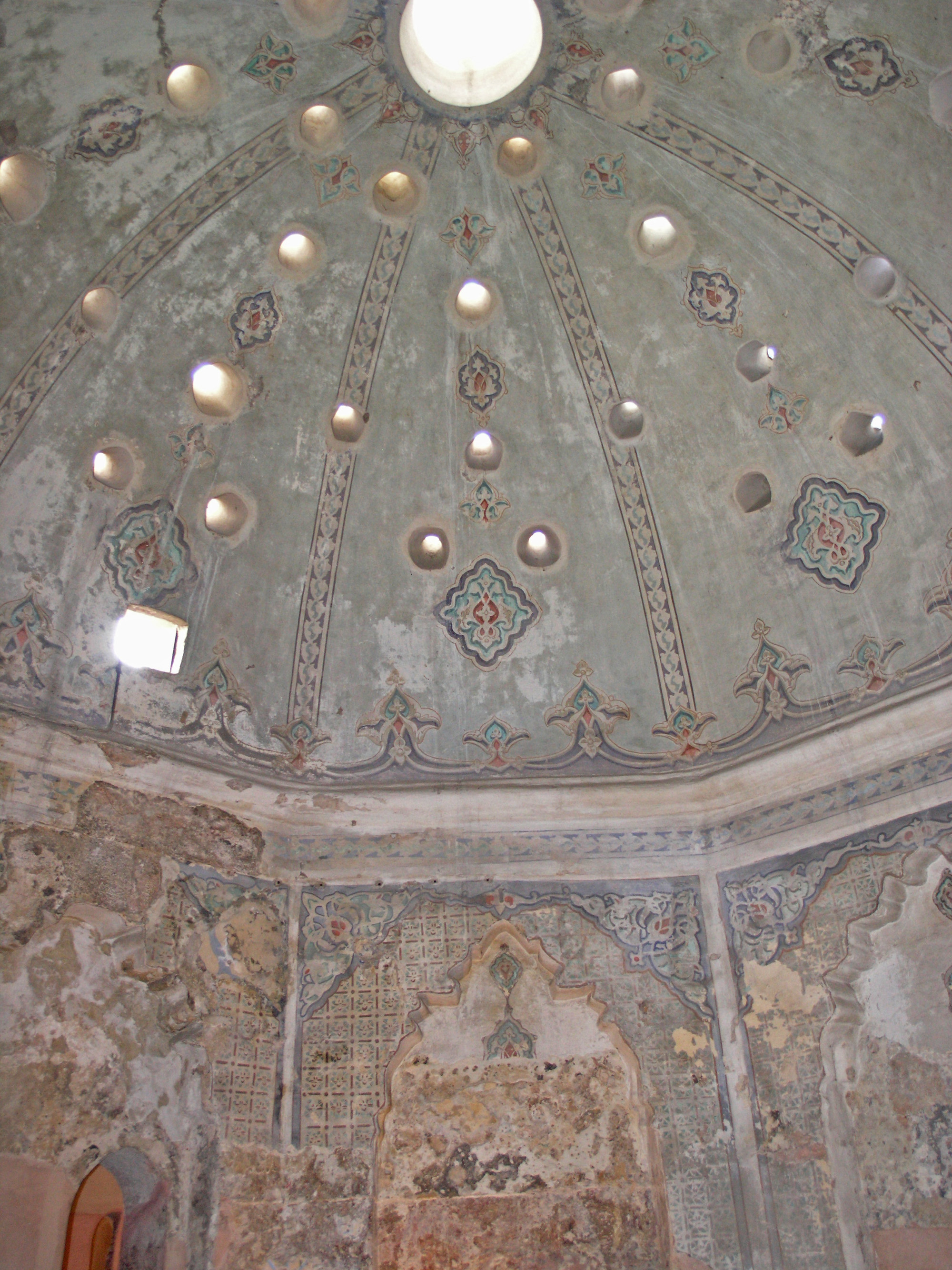
Cupola with occuli in the tepid room of the male quarter

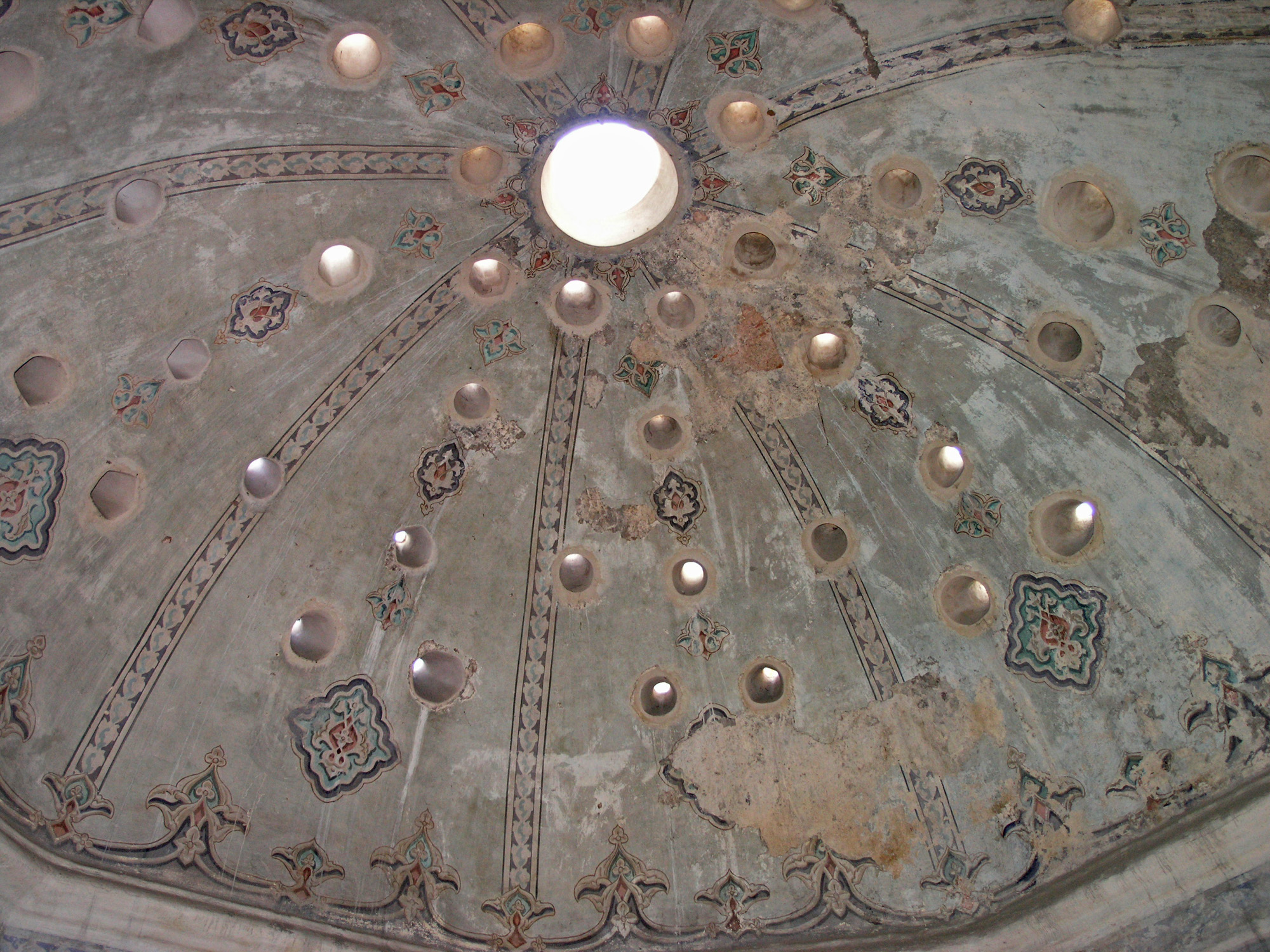
Cupola with occuli in the tepid room of the male quarter

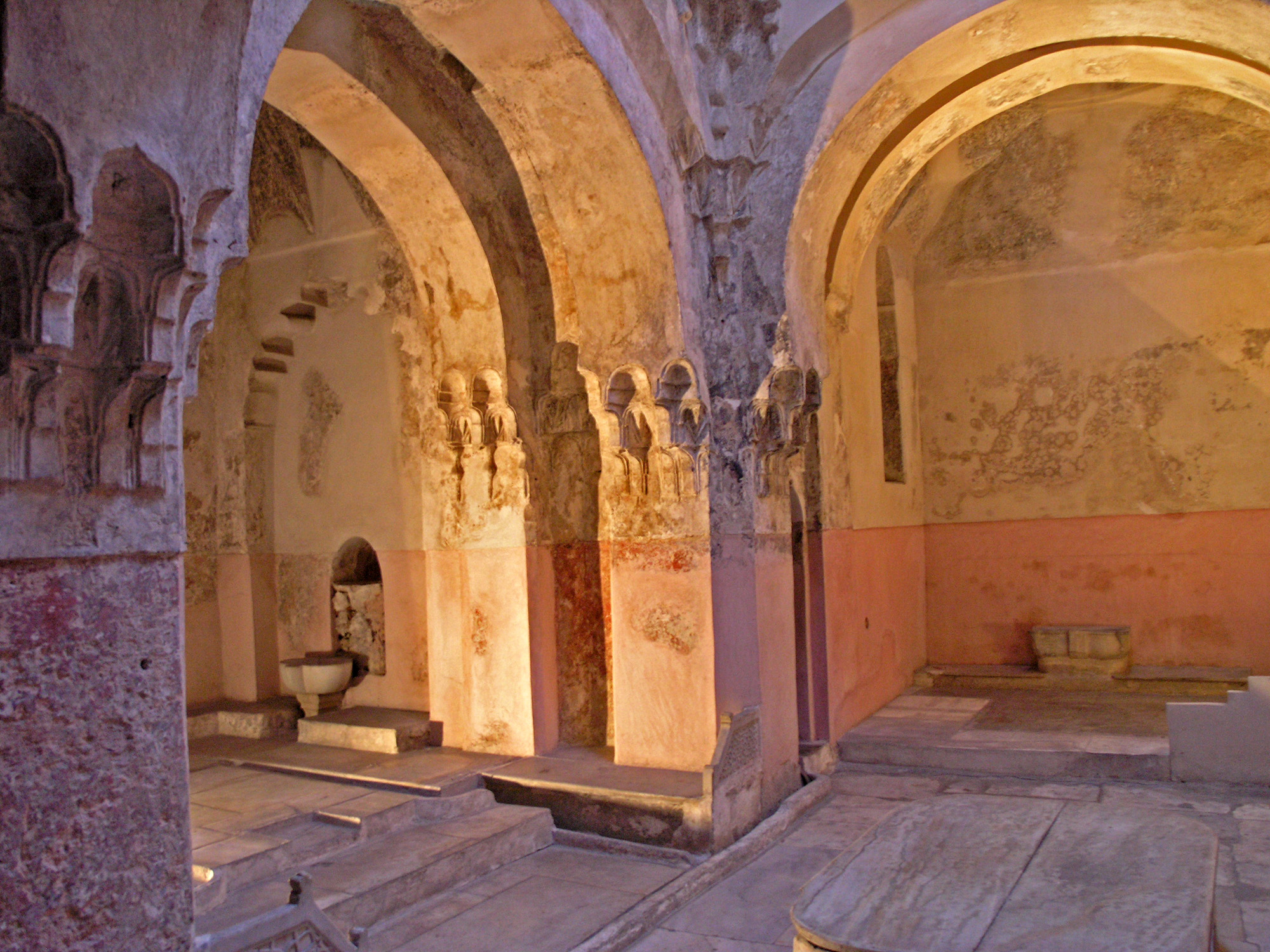
Hot room of the male quarter

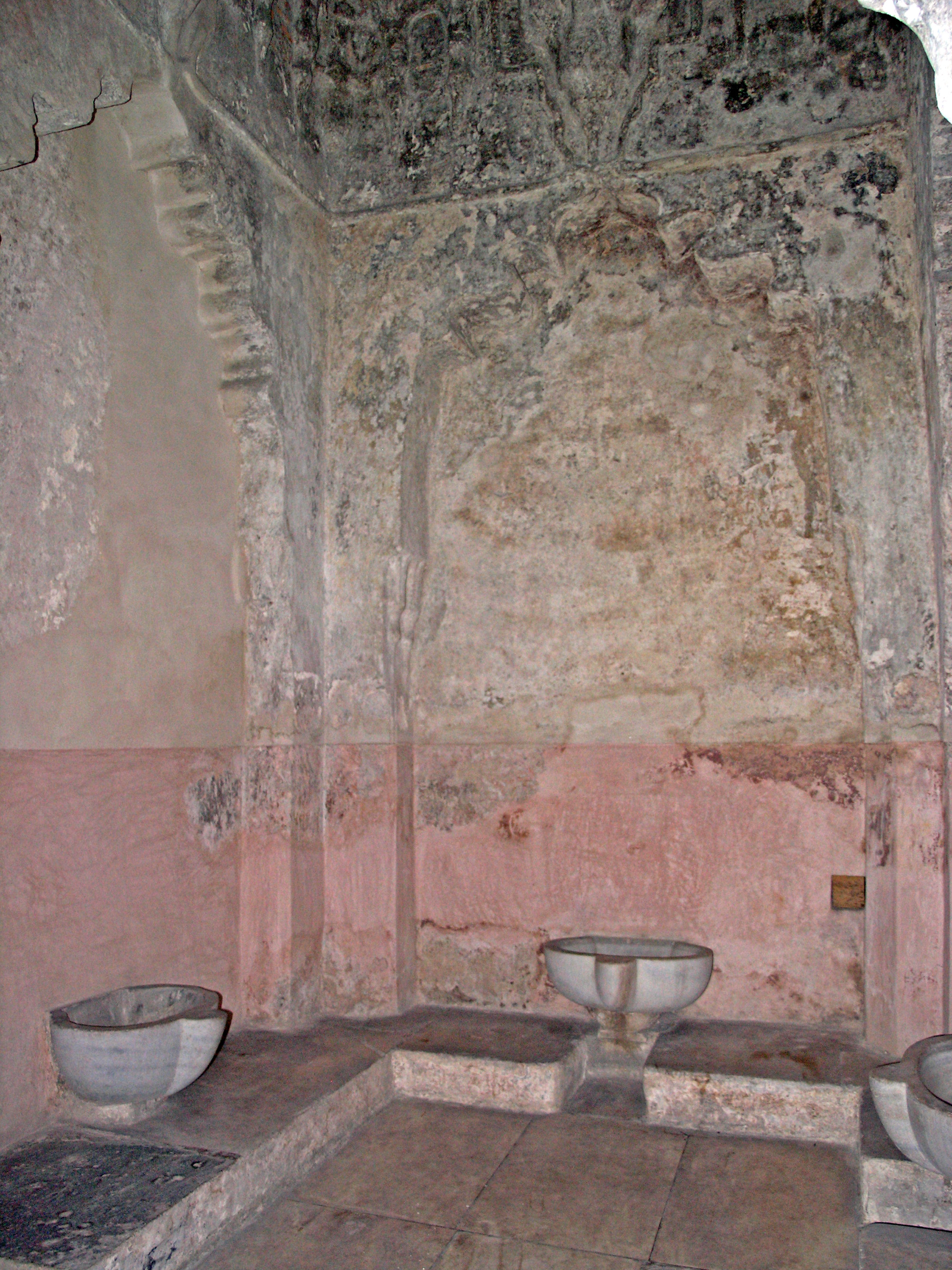
Hot room of the male quarter

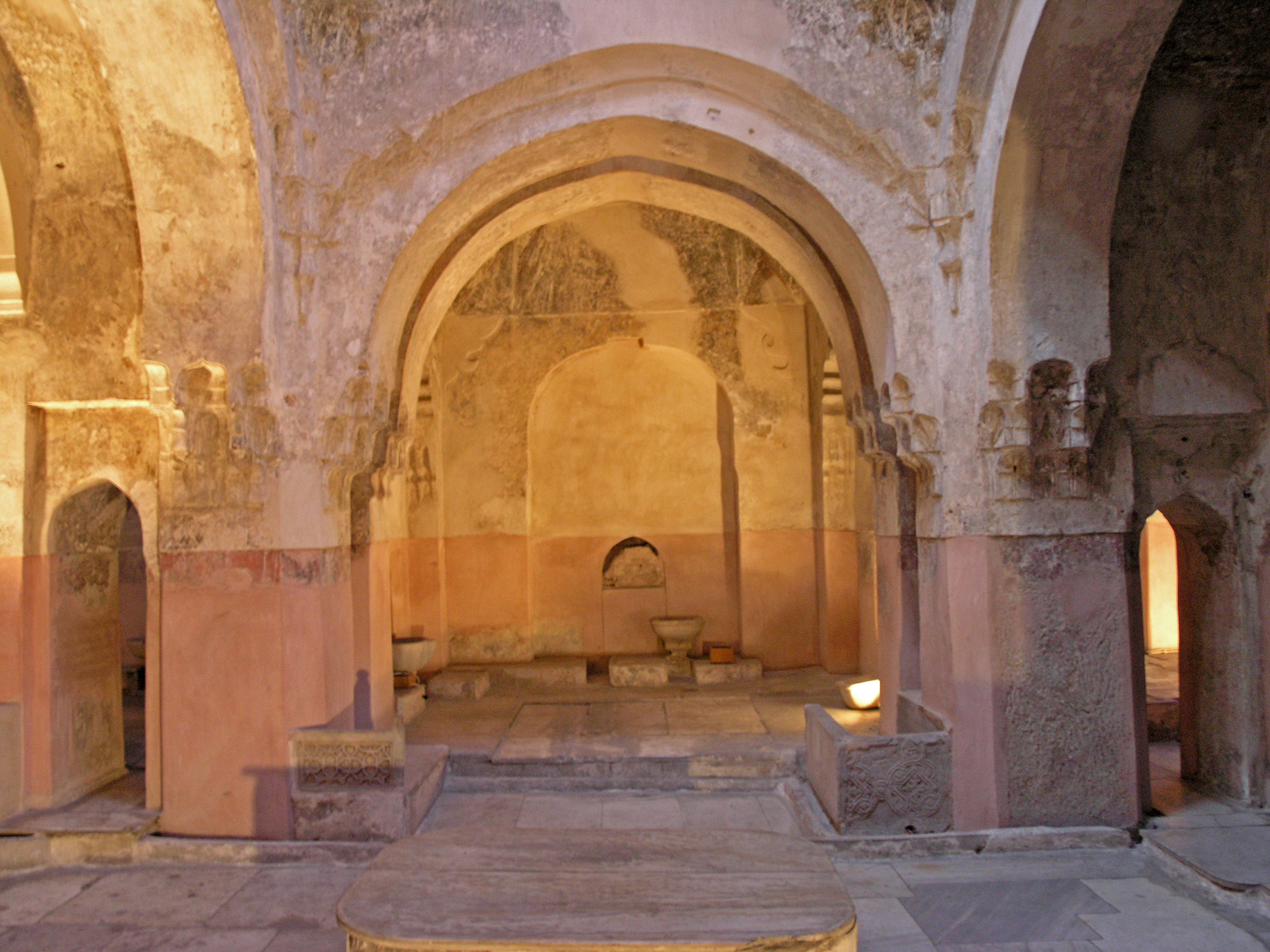
Hot room of the male quarter
