= Tersefanou =

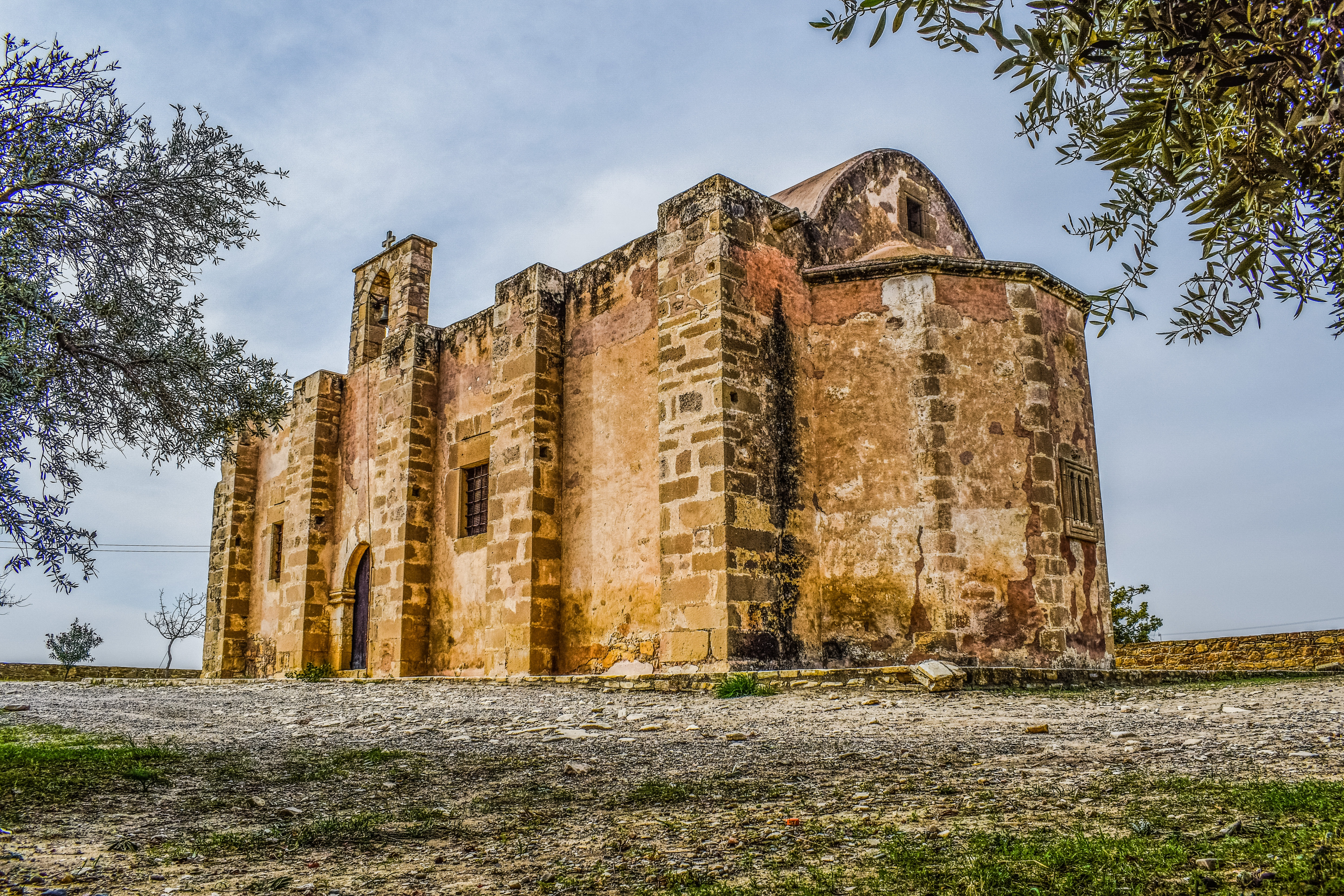

- Location within Cyprus
- Coordinates: 34°51′17″N 33°32′46″E
- Country: Cyprus
- District: Larnaca District

Population (2011)
  - Total: 1,299
- Time zone: UTC+2 (EET)
  - Summer (DST): UTC+3 (EEST)
- Website: http://www.tersefanou.org/

Tersefanou (Greek: Τερσεφάνου) is a village in the Larnaca District of Cyprus, located 2 northwest of Kiti.
