= Meneou =

Meneou Μενεού (Greek)
- Municipality
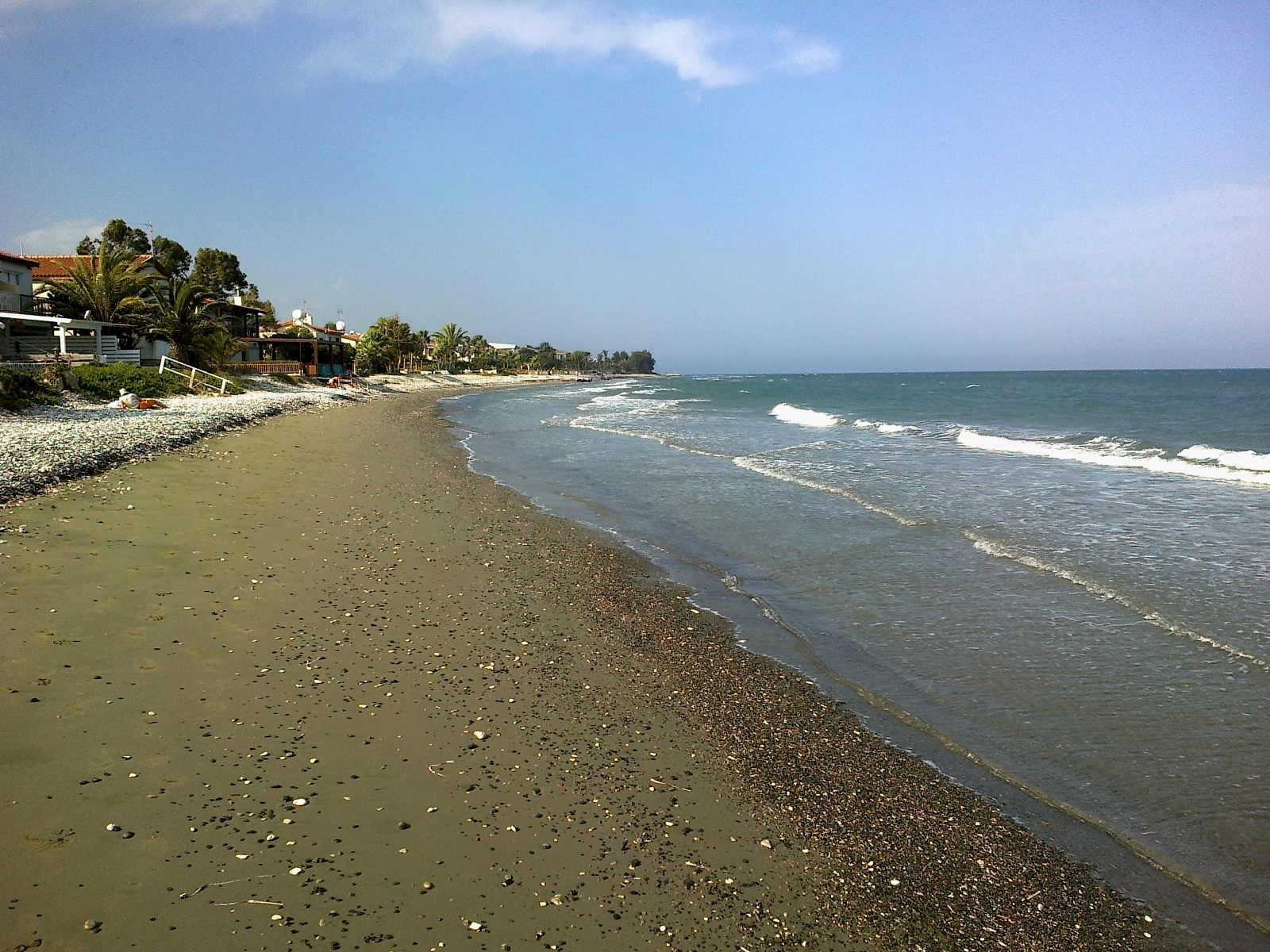

- Location in Cyprus
- Coordinates: 34°51′53″N 33°35′26″E
- Country: Cyprus
- District: Larnaca District

Population (2001)
  - Total: 1,196
- Time zone: UTC+2 (EET)
  - Summer (DST): UTC+3 (EEST)

Meneou (Greek: Μενεού) is a village in the Larnaca District of Cyprus, located 3 km northeast of Kiti.
