= Panagia tis Angeloktistis =

Byzantine church in Cyprus

Coordinates: 34.8476°N 33.5710°E

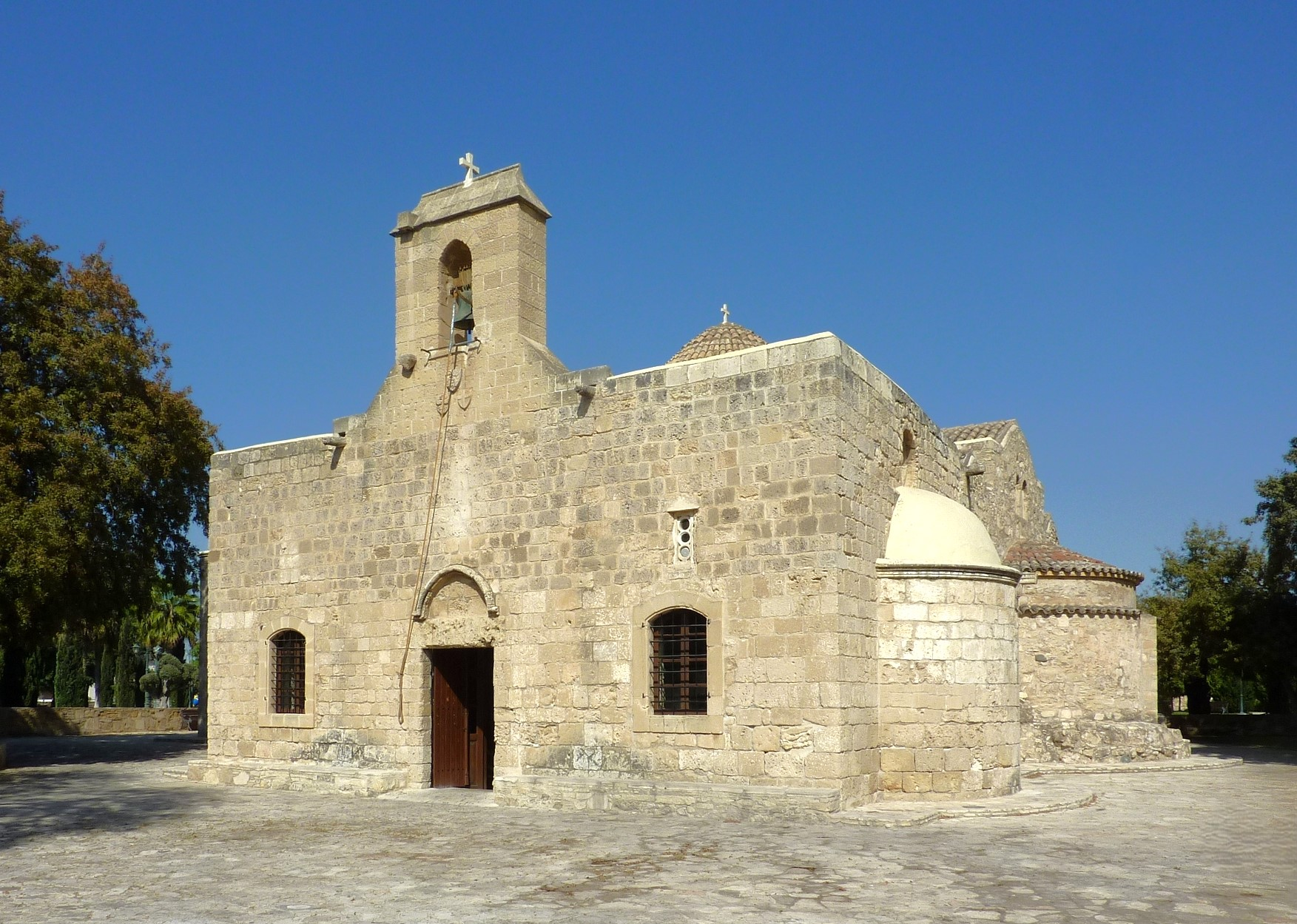
Panagia tis Angeloktistis

Panagia tis Angeloktistis (Greek: Παναγία της Αγγελόκτιστης) or Panagia Angeloktisti (Παναγία Αγγελόκτιστη, "Panagia Built by Angels") is a Byzantine church located in the village of Kiti, Cyprus, roughly 12 kilometers to the southwest of modern-day Larnaka and the ancient city Kition.

The Church of Panagia Aggeloktisti was submitted as a possible UNESCO World Heritage Site in September 2015 and is currently listed on the list of Tentative UNESCO World Heritage Site.

== History ==
=== 5th to 6th century ===
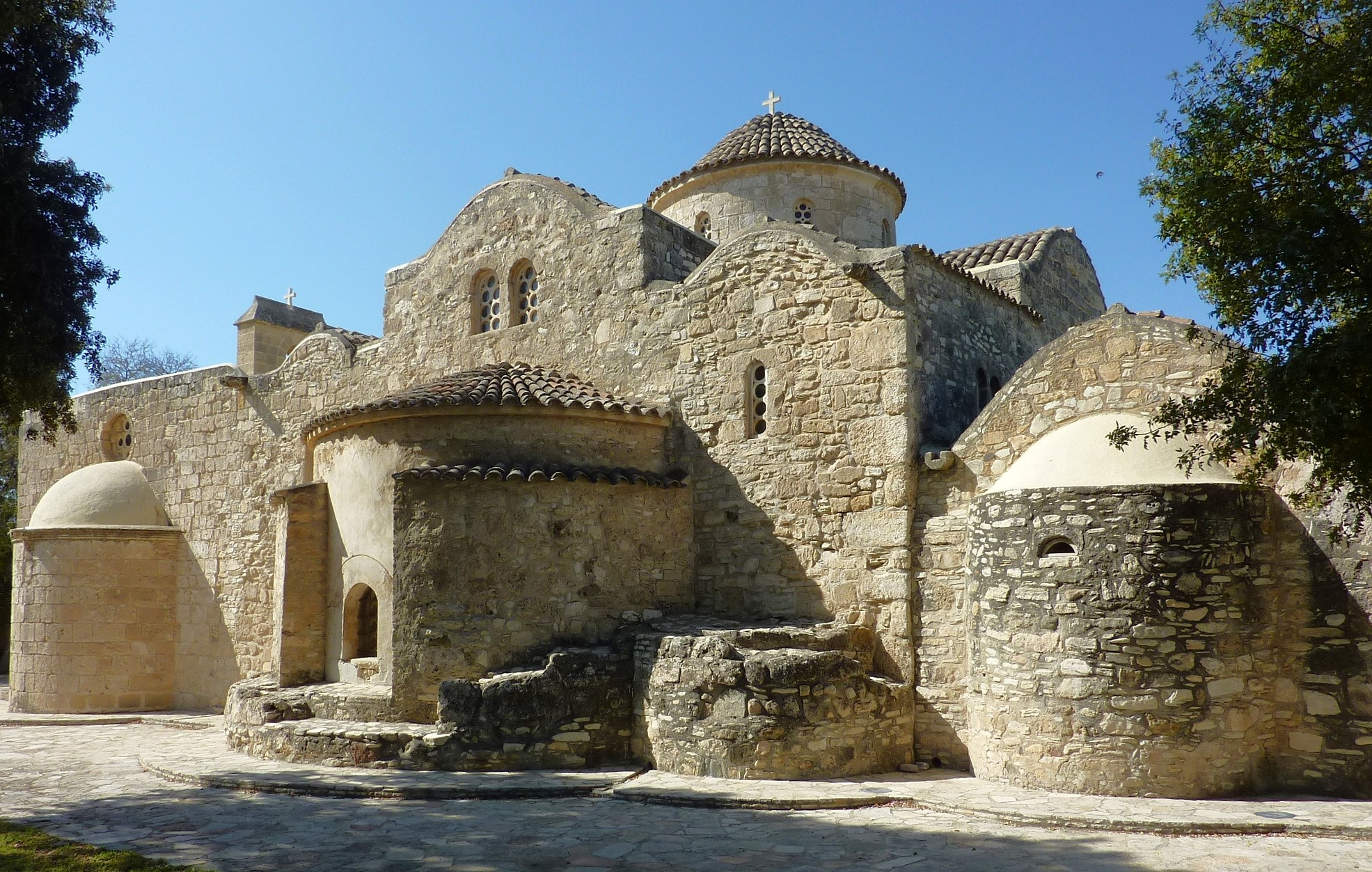
View from the northeast

The original structure was a wooden-roofed basilica; all other basilicas in Cyprus from this time had wooden roofs as well. The basilica was most likely built in the 5th century although the mosaic in the apse dates to the 6th century. The island of Cyprus had been part of the Byzantine Empire for more than 100 years at this point (see Cyprus in the Middle Ages and Cyprus).

Like many Cypriot basilicas, the Kiti basilica was destroyed around the 7th and 8th centuries. Some historians have noted that this destruction coincides with many Arab raids in the area as the Byzantine Empire struggled to sustain the periphery of its empire. Other historians have noted that the churches were wooden structures and lit by oil lamps, “a bad fire risk at the best of times”. The apse and the famous mosaic of Panagia tis Angeloktisti survived the destruction and were incorporated into the church that was later built over the basilica’s foundations. The apse, mosaic, and church all still exist today. Merrillees notes that “in 688-9 the caliph Abd al-Malik (reg 685-705) signed an agreement with Justinian II (reg 685-95; 705-11) in which Cyprus [became neutral territory] …. [and] owing to its neutral status, Cyprus was largely unaffected by the iconoclast controversy (730-843)”.

There is dispute among historians whether the incorporation of the basilica remains were incorporated into the new structure because it allowed the new church to be built more quickly or if the inclusion of the older structure would have been more difficult and labor intensive than building a new church, and only done because the older remains were important to the surrounding community.

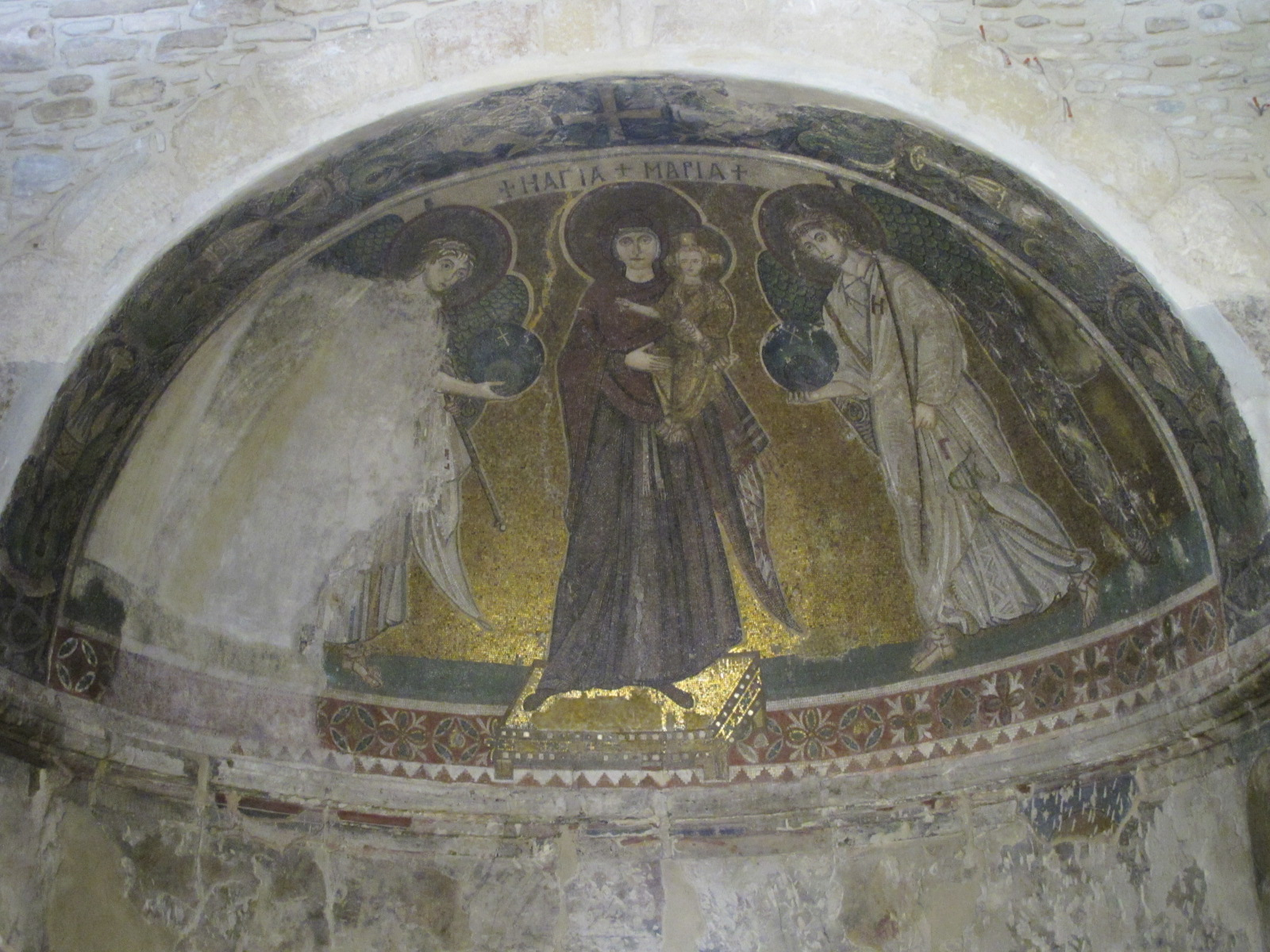

=== 11th century ===
The church was constructed between the mid-11th and early 12th centuries, after Byzantine rule was re-established in Cyprus in 965. The 11th and 12th centuries in particular saw an expansion of chapels and churches by the Byzantine governors of Cyprus and other officials. The domed, cross-in-square church in Kiti was built over the remains of the destroyed basilica. Megaw notes that “an early basilica apse [was] incorporated into the small domed church of the Panagia tis Kyras (Livadia) ” in Livadia, Cyprus as well. The incorporation of the basilica foundations meant the church had an elongated cross-in-square layout but with a centralized design.

A small excavation of the basement in 1959 lead to the discovery of a number of graves built into the earlier foundations of the church, indicating that the early Christian basilica had served as a burial ground prior to the construction of the Middle Byzantine church. This excavation also provided evidence that “the current church at Kiti was preceded by two construction phases, a columned basilica followed by a pier basilica in the 6th or 7th century”. The church was constructed out of rubble masonry, like the Pangia Kyra, which was also rebuilt to include the remains of an earlier basilica and Christian mosaic

== Notable elements and decorations ==
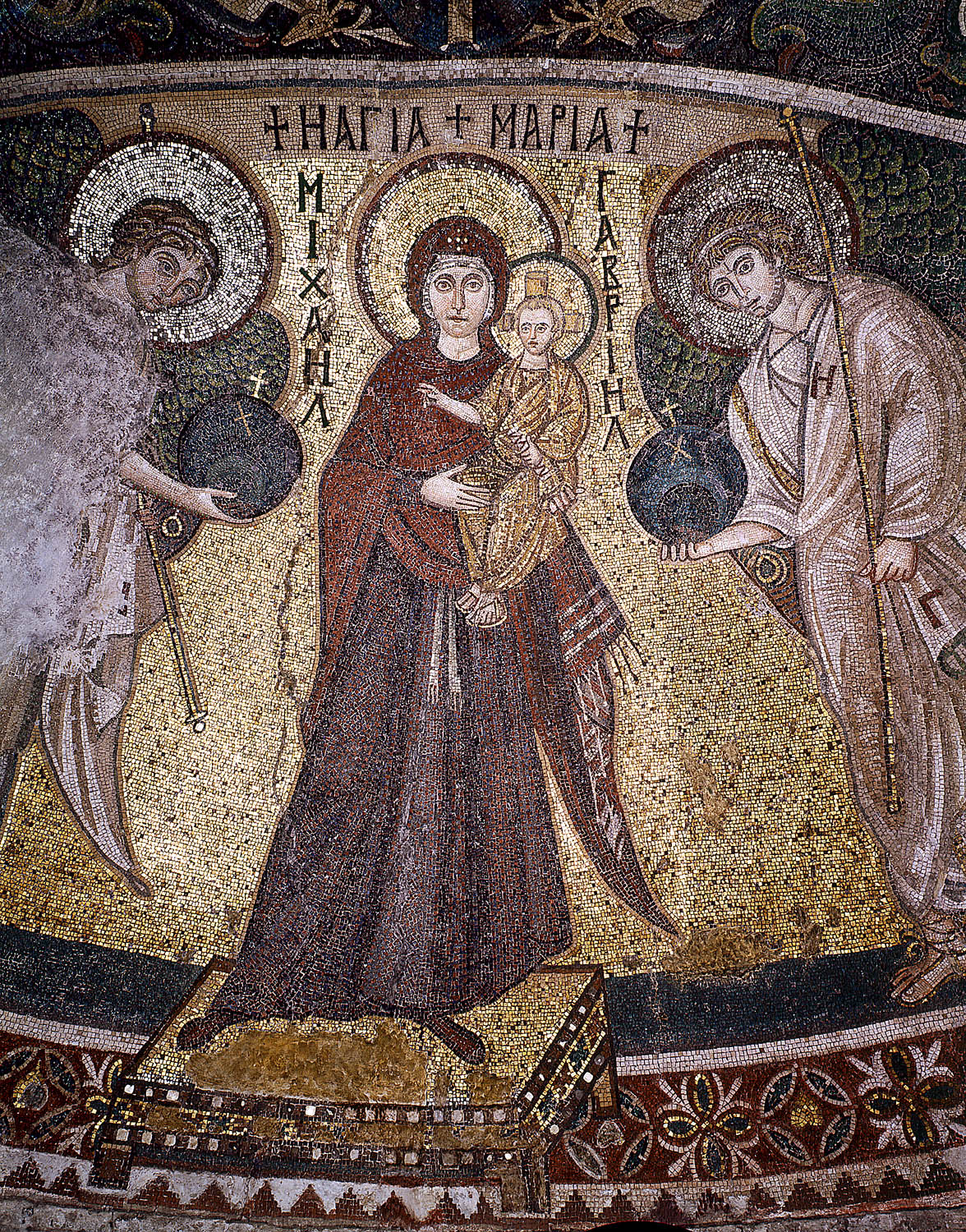
Detail of the Virgin and Christ Child flanked by Archangels Michael and Gabriel in apse conch

The mosaic of Panagia tis Angeloktisti is one of the best preserved early Christian wall mosaics of Cyprus and was likely created in the late 6th century. The period of Justin II saw the expanded production of wall and floor mosaics, and Cyprus was no exception. In Kiti, the Virgin Mary holds in her left arm the Christ Child, in the Hodegetria style, and stands on stool in a manner that makes her appear almost as if she were standing in mid-air. On the Virgin’s right is the archangel Michael and on her left is the archangel Gabriel, and all are situated against a golden background. Both angels’ wings appear to be made from peacock feathers, which is a symbol of eternal life. The angels appear to hold a scepter and offer a globe with a cross at the apex, which symbolizes the offering of earthly domination to Christ and the Virgin. Megaw notes that these features are repeated in the mosaic at Saint Catherine’s Monastery in the Sinai and help corroborate the sixth century dating of the mosaic.

Megaw notes precision and delicacy used to construct the faces in Kiti “is markedly different from the impressionistic manner used at Lythrankomi,” but is echoed in the technique used on the faces of San Vitale at Ravenna. Above the Virgin Mary is the phrase “HAGIA MARIA,” thereby naming her as Holy Mary or St. Mary instead of “ Theotokos ” (Mother of God). After the Council of Ephesus of 431 CE bestowed upon the Virgin Mary the title of St. Mary the name became increasingly commonly used instead of Theotokos.

The mosaic is completed with a border depicting the Fountain of Life with pairs of ducks, beribboned parrots (a Persian symbol of terrestrial power), and deer or stags (a reference to the 41st and/or 42nd Psalm) are shown drinking from the fountains. Megaw notes that similar Fountain of Life imagery was also used in the ambo of Bishop Agnellus in Ravenna; other historians have drawn parallels to this Byzantine imagery in Salona, Zadar in Croatia, Stobi, Amphipolis in Macedonia, Greece (e.g. Basilica), and Edessa in Macedonia. Mullet suggests that beginning in 5th century Christian basilicas there was “a general development whereby the natural world is brought into the House of the Lord” and that this style especially thrived in the 6th century.
