= Church of St Demetrius, Patalenitsa =

Church in Patalenitsa, Bulgaria

Coordinates: 42°7′13.9″N 24°12′2.1″E

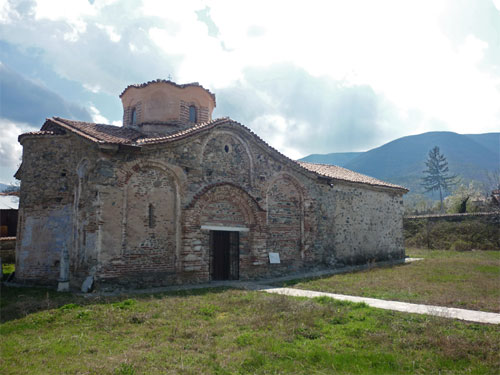
The Church of St Demetrius in Patalenitsa

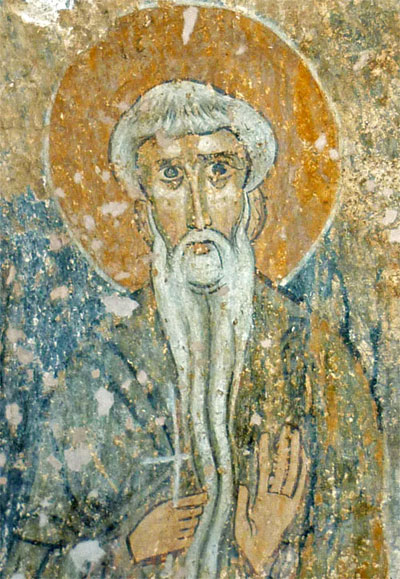
A mural portrait inside the church

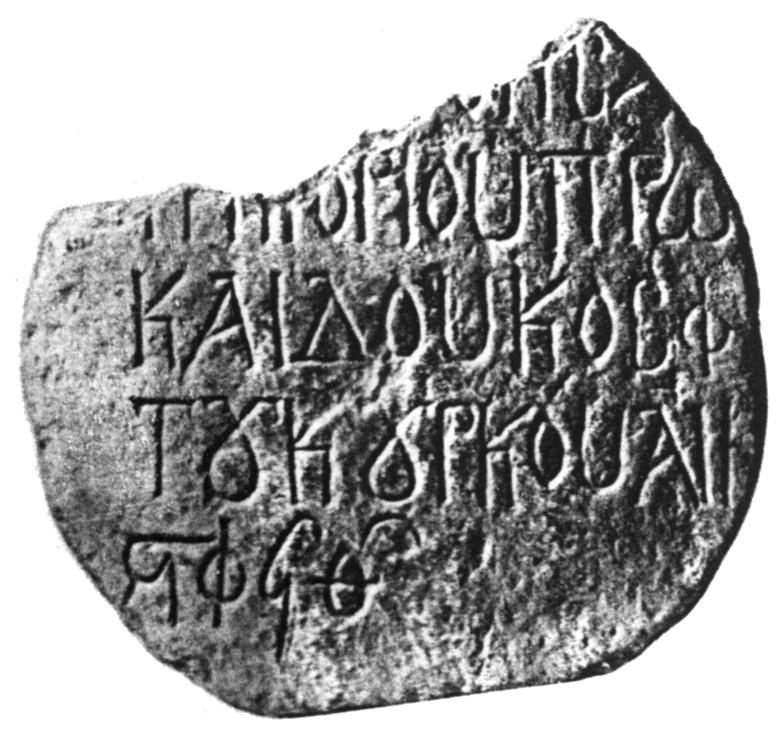
Inscription of Gregory Kourkouas from the church

The Church of St Demetrius (Bulgarian: църква „Свети Димитър“, tsarkva „Sveti Dimitar“) is a medieval Eastern Orthodox church in southwestern Bulgaria. It lies in the village of Patalenitsa, administratively part of Pazardzhik Municipality within Pazardzhik Province. The church was built in the 11th–14th century, with a possible dating to 1091 based on a stone plate inscription, the present location or even existence of which is unclear. Its frescoes, discovered in 1961 and restored in the 1970s, are a work of the 12th–13th century.

Built in the vicinity of an older church, the Church of St Demetrius is a crossed-dome stone building. According to several legends, the church was dug into the ground as the Ottomans conquered Bulgaria, so that it may be protected from desecration. It was only unearthed in the middle of the 19th century, when it was dedicated to Saint Demetrius. It was proclaimed a monument of culture of national importance in 1956.

== History and dating ==
According to Bulgarian National Revival enlightener Stefan Zahariev from Pazardzhik, St Demetrius was not the first church in this location. In his description of the Pazardzhik district (kaza) published in 1870, he writes that a previously existing church in roughly the same place was dedicated to Saint Pantaleon and had given its name to the village of Patalenitsa. The Church of St Pantaleon was, according to Zahariev, previously an Ancient Greek sanctuary of Asclepius. He writes that a column from this church with an inscription dedicated to Asclepius was preserved in the newer village church.

The time of the present church's construction cannot be exactly defined. Scholars such as Atanas Bozhkov are of the opinion that the Church of St Demetrius was built in the early 12th century, while Krastyo Miyatev and Neli Chaneva–Veleva date it to the late 12th or early 13th century. One author has placed its construction in the late 13th or early 14th century and others include the 11th century among the possibilities.

Some publications refer to a marble plate found in the church and bearing a Medieval Greek inscription with the following text: "[by] Gregory Kourkouas, pro[tospatharios] and duke of Ph[ilippopolis], indiction 14, year 6599 (= 1090/1091)". The plate is preserved in the National Archaeological Museum in Sofia (inv. n. 253). Nevertheless, in the late 19th century the church was known as the Holy Kutruleshtitsa (Света Кутрулещица, Sveta Kutruleshtitsa) to the locals, which may indicate a connection to the name of Gregory Kourkouas from the plate.

Another legend tells of the digging of the church into the ground after the Ottoman conquest of Bulgaria (14th–15th centuries), so that the Ottomans would not desecrate it. According to that story, the church was buried and forgotten about by the villagers until the mid-19th century, when a local coincidentally rediscovered it while tying his donkey to a nearby cherry tree. A different version places the cherry tree on top of the hill under which the church stood. Reportedly, that cherry tree was struck by a thunderbolt, which enabled the villagers to reach the buried gate through the now-hollow trunk. The church was reconsecrated soon thereafter and dedicated to the 4th-century military saint Demetrius of Thessaloniki.

The church was listed among the architectural monuments of culture of national importance in 1956, and the subsequent discovery of its early murals led to its inclusion on the list of artistic monuments of culture in 1971.

== Architecture and decoration ==
The Church of St Demetrius in Patalenitsa was built of stone, though the dome and side bays also exhibit brickwork. The church is 9.20 metres (30.2 ft) long and 7.60 m (24.9 ft) wide, and is among the relatively few medieval churches of the crossed-dome type still standing in Bulgaria. It has an octagonal dome and a five-sided apse. The south facade features three bays with narrow windows attached. The church's floor was originally covered with marble, though the marble was removed in one of the possibly three rounds of reconstruction that the church underwent. For example, the present narthex was not added until the final reconstruction some time in the 19th century.

Medieval frescoes used to cover the entirety of the church's interior, though only some 70 fragments survive until today. Until 1961, the existence of a medieval mural layer was unknown because the walls were covered with oil paint in the 1910s. The medieval frescoes were uncovered and restored between 1970 and 1975 by a team under Dragomir Peshev. The dating of the frescoes is as controversial as that of the church itself. Bozhkov places the painting of the murals in the 12th century, while scholars Bistra Nikolova and V. Mavrodinova believe they were created in the 13th century. According to Nikolova, the mural inscriptions in Medieval Greek (as opposed to Middle Bulgarian) are evidence that the frescoes were painted during the Byzantine rule of Bulgaria (1018–1185). At the time, the region of Patalenitsa would have belonged to the Byzantine bishopric centred at Philippopolis (modern Plovdiv).

Among the biblical scenes painted inside the Church of St Demetrius are the Ascension of Jesus, which adorns the altar vault, as well as the Resurrection of Lazarus and the Transfiguration of Jesus, which decorate the vault left of the apse. Images of a number of saints have also been preserved, including these of the patron saint Demetrius, Saint George riding a white horse, Saint Achillius of Larissa and Saint Nicholas.
