= Patalenitsa =

Patalenitsa Маталеница
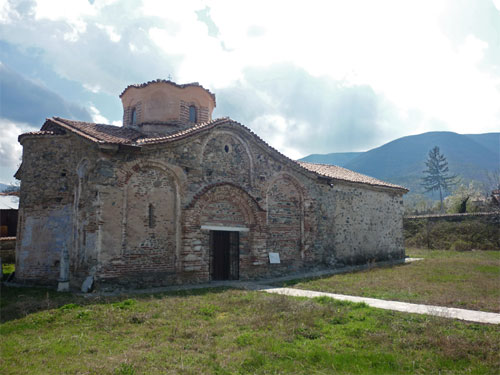
- Church of St Demetrius, Patalenitsa

- Patalenitsa
- Coordinates: 42°7′1″N 24°12′0″E
- Country: Bulgaria
- Province (Oblast): Pazardzhik

Government
  - Mayor: Angel Nalbatski
- Elevation: 352 m (1,155 ft)

Population (2010)
  - Total: 1,236
- Time zone: UTC+2 (EET)
  - Summer (DST): UTC+3 (EEST)
- Postal Code: 4418
- Area code: 03516

Patalenitsa (Bulgarian: Паталеница) is a village in southwestern Bulgaria, administratively part of Pazardzhik Municipality within Pazardzhik Province. It lies 15 kilometres (9.3 mi) southwest of Pazardzhik, at the northern foot of the Karkaria ridge of the western Rhodope Mountains, some 370 metres (1,210 ft) above sea level. In 1955, the nearby village of Batkun was merged to Patalenitsa.

There are several ancient and medieval sights in and around Patalenitsa. These include the 11th–14th century crossed-dome Church of St Demetrius with its preserved frescoes, the Batkun Monastery, which was founded in the Middle Ages and last reestablished in the 19th century, the ruins of the medieval Batkun Fortress (Batkounion), and the ruins of an ancient sanctuary of Asclepius dating to the 1st–4th century. Besides the medieval but inactive St Demetrius, there are two other Bulgarian Orthodox churches in Patalenitsa. The Church of the Dormition of the Mother of God was built in 1708, while the Church of the Holy Mother of God in the Batkun neighbourhood is newer and dates to 1892. In addition, there is a new chapel dedicated to Saint George, which was constructed in 2002 at the place of an older one.

There are several theories explaining the etymology of the village's name. According to one theory, it is tied to the name of Saint Pantaleon, a church dedicated to whom occupied the present site of the village's Church of St Demetrius. A second explanation derives the name from the village of Patele in Aegean Macedonia (today Agios Panteleimonas, Florina regional unit, Greece), from which people settled in Patalenitsa in the 18th century. Another possibility is a link to the Bulgarian word pat (път, "road"), due to Patalenitsa's position on a crossroad.

The village has its own village hall, the present building of which dates to 1970, a cultural centre (chitalishte) established in 1909, and a monument to the locals who perished as Bulgarian Army soldiers in the Balkan Wars and World War I. The earliest school in Patalenitsa was founded in 1865, though the current edifice of the village school was constructed in 1923.
