= Agios Georgios, Kyrenia =

Agios Georgios: Άγιος Γεώργιος (Greek); Karaoğlanoğlu (Turkish)
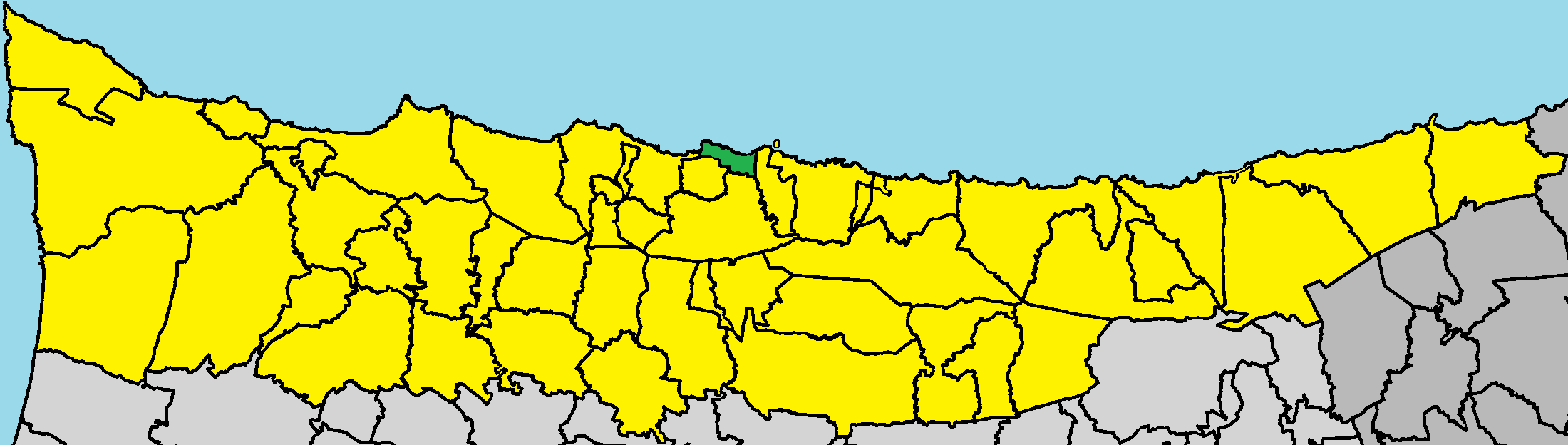
- A map of Agios Georgios in Kyrenia district

- Location in Cyprus
- Coordinates: 35°20′32″N 33°16′14″E
- Country (de jure): Cyprus
  - District: Kyrenia District
- Country (de facto): Northern Cyprus
  - District: Girne District

Population (2011)
  - Total: 3,745
- Time zone: UTC+2 (EET)
  - Summer (DST): UTC+3 (EEST)

Agios Georgios (Greek: Άγιος Γεώργιος; Turkish: Karaoğlanoğlu) is a village located in the Kyrenia District of Cyprus, west of the town of Kyrenia. Since 1974, it is under the control of Northern Cyprus as part of the Girne Municipitality. Its population in 2011 was 3,745.
