= Church of St George, Kyustendil =

Coordinates: 42°16′14.21″N 22°40′36.97″E

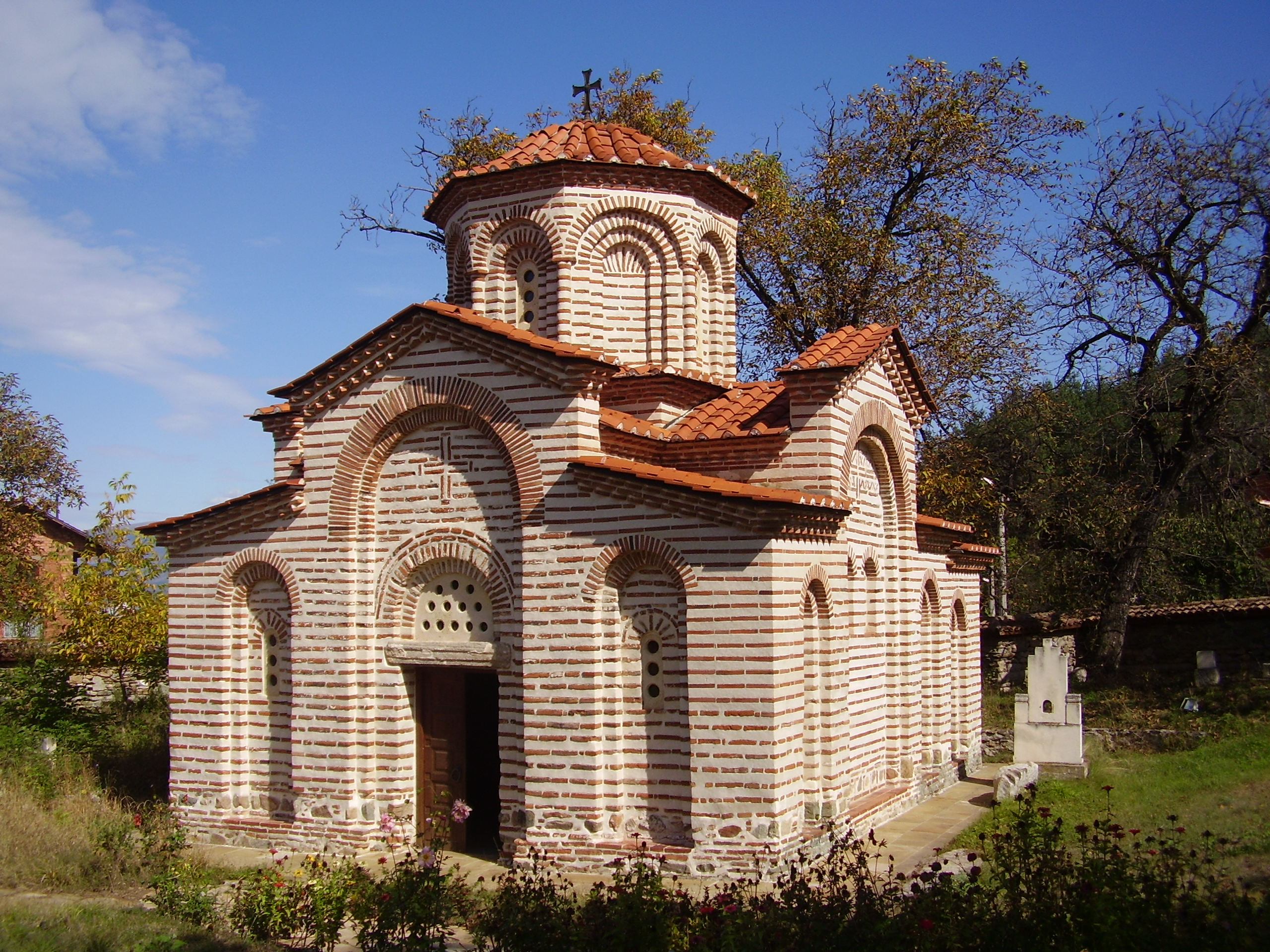
The Church of St George in Kyustendil

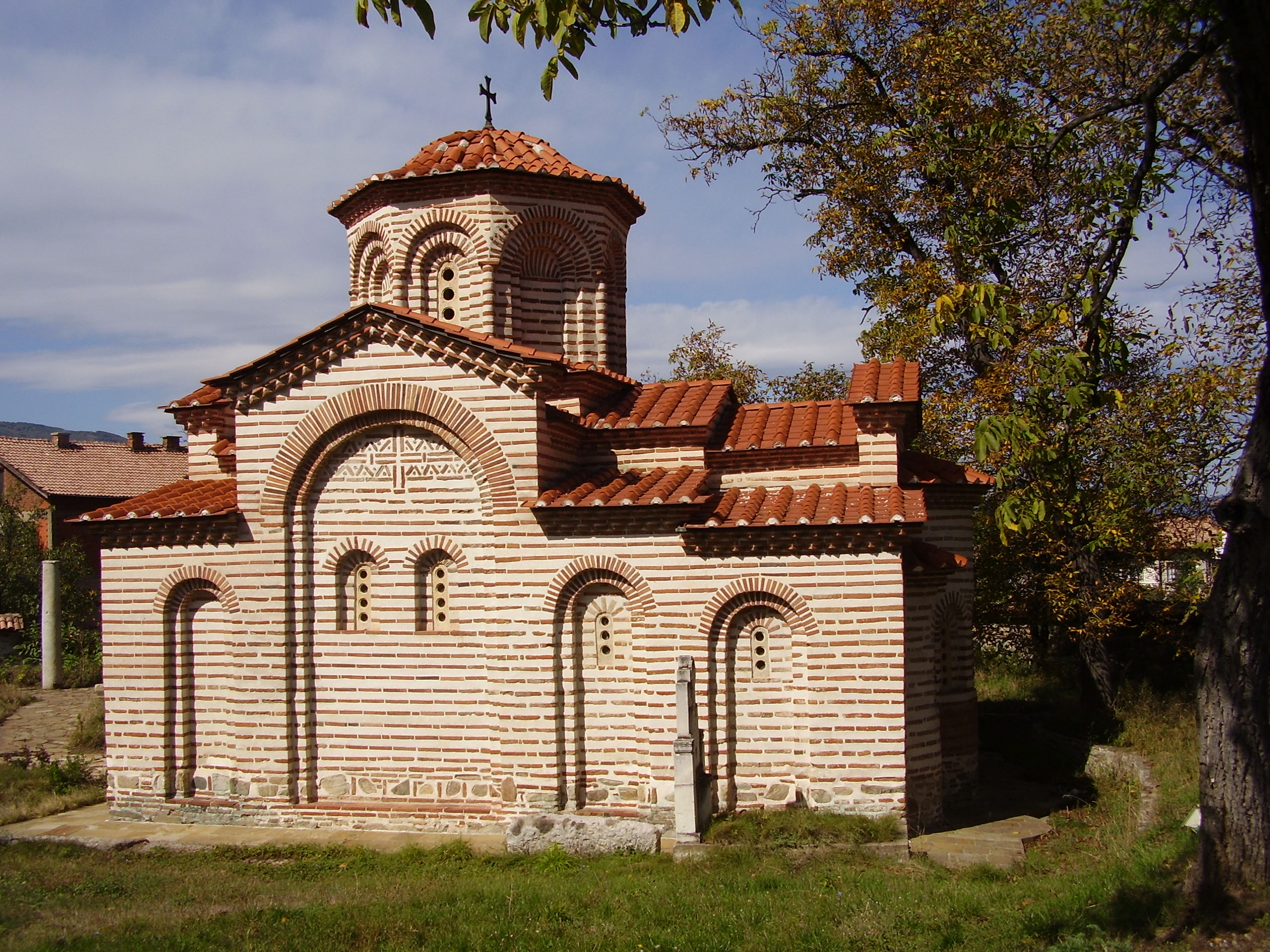
Side view

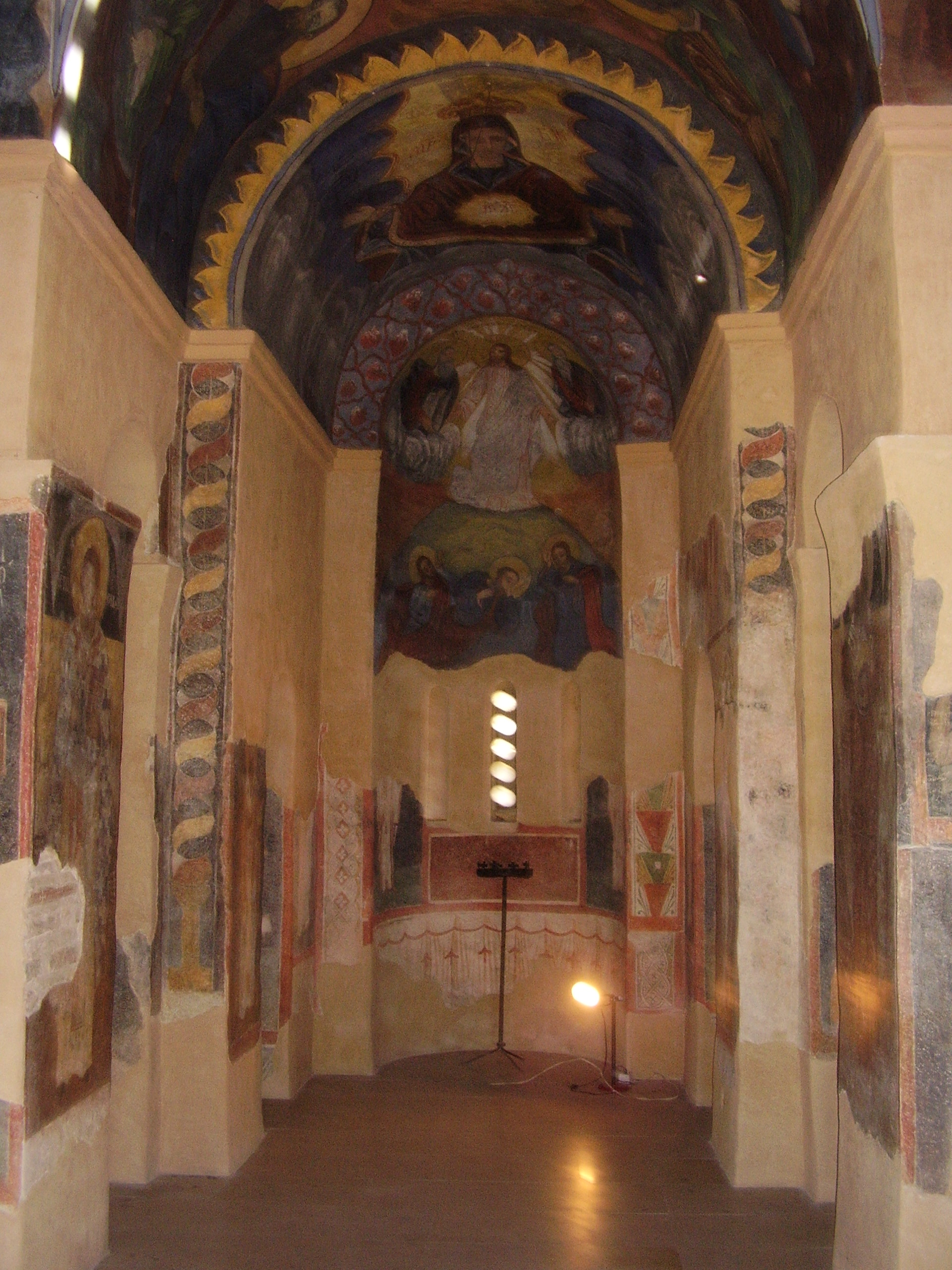
Interior view

The Church of St George (Bulgarian: църква „Свети Георги“, tsarkva „Sveti Georgi“) is a medieval Eastern Orthodox church in the city of Kyustendil, which lies in southwestern Bulgaria and is the administrative capital of Kyustendil Province. The church is located in the Kolusha neighbourhood, which was historically separate from the city. The church was constructed in the 10th–11th century and its frescoes are somewhat later, as the earliest layers were painted in the 11th–12th century.

== History ==
The Church of St George is dated to the late 10th or early 11th century based on its architectural appearance and mural paintings, which makes it the oldest preserved church in the city. It is located in Kyustendil's southwestern part, in the former village of Kolusha, which in 1939 was merged into the city.

There is a theory that Bulgarian emperor Michael Shishman was buried in the Church of St George after he perished in the Battle of Velbazhd in 1330. The battle was a Serbian victory over the Second Bulgarian Empire which paved the way for the short-lived Serbian dominance over the Balkans in the mid-14th century. However, scholar Bistra Nikolova entirely dismisses this theory as an "erroneous reference in [Bulgarian history] literature".

Despite being located outside Kyustendil at the time, up until the construction of the city's main Bulgarian National Revival-style church in 1816, the Church of St George served as Kyustendil's cathedral. The church suffered some severe damage during the 19th century, the time of the Ottoman rule of Bulgaria; it was mostly destroyed, leaving only the foundations of the arches. It was reconstructed in 1878–1880, just after the establishment of the Principality of Bulgaria, with further restoration in the 2000s.

== Architecture and decoration ==
The church follows the Byzantine cross-in-square design and measures 10 by 8.70 metres (32.8 ft × 28.5 ft). The dome is octagonal and features eight bays, four of which contain windows. There is no narthex and the cella appears square. A total of six pillars support the church from the inside. Two frame the entrance of the altar, while the remaining four stand below the dome. The church has three apses, all of a semicircular design. Materials used for the church's construction were bricks and mortar, resulting in interchanging rows of red and white.

The church's interior has preserved a number of medieval frescoes, particularly in the lower reaches of the walls and pillars. The paintings in the altar were done in the 11th–12th century, while the decoration of the pillars dates to the 12th century. All inscriptions that accompany the murals are in Medieval Greek. The altar features the images of four deacons bearing a censer and monstrances as well as two bishops who could possibly be identified as Basil of Caesarea and John Chrysostom. A number of saints are also depicted inside the church, including Saint Elijah, Saints Cosmas and Damian, Saint Hermolaus, Saint Pantaleon, and four unidentified female saints. There are also later works of art in the church. It boasts icons or murals by painter Ivan Dospevski from 1881 as well as works by Mihail Belstoynev.

Due to its architectural and artistic value, the Church of St George has been part of the list of Bulgaria's monuments of cultural of national importance since 1927. With the reorganization of the list in the 1960s, it was included on it both as an architectural and as an artistic monument, in 1968 and 1969 respectively. Together with the native house of Dimitar Peshev and the city art Gallery “Vladimir Dimitrov – Maystora”, since 2010 it has been listed as number 26 among the 100 Tourist Sites of Bulgaria.
