= Megali Panagia Monastery =

- Μονή Μεγάλης Παναγίας
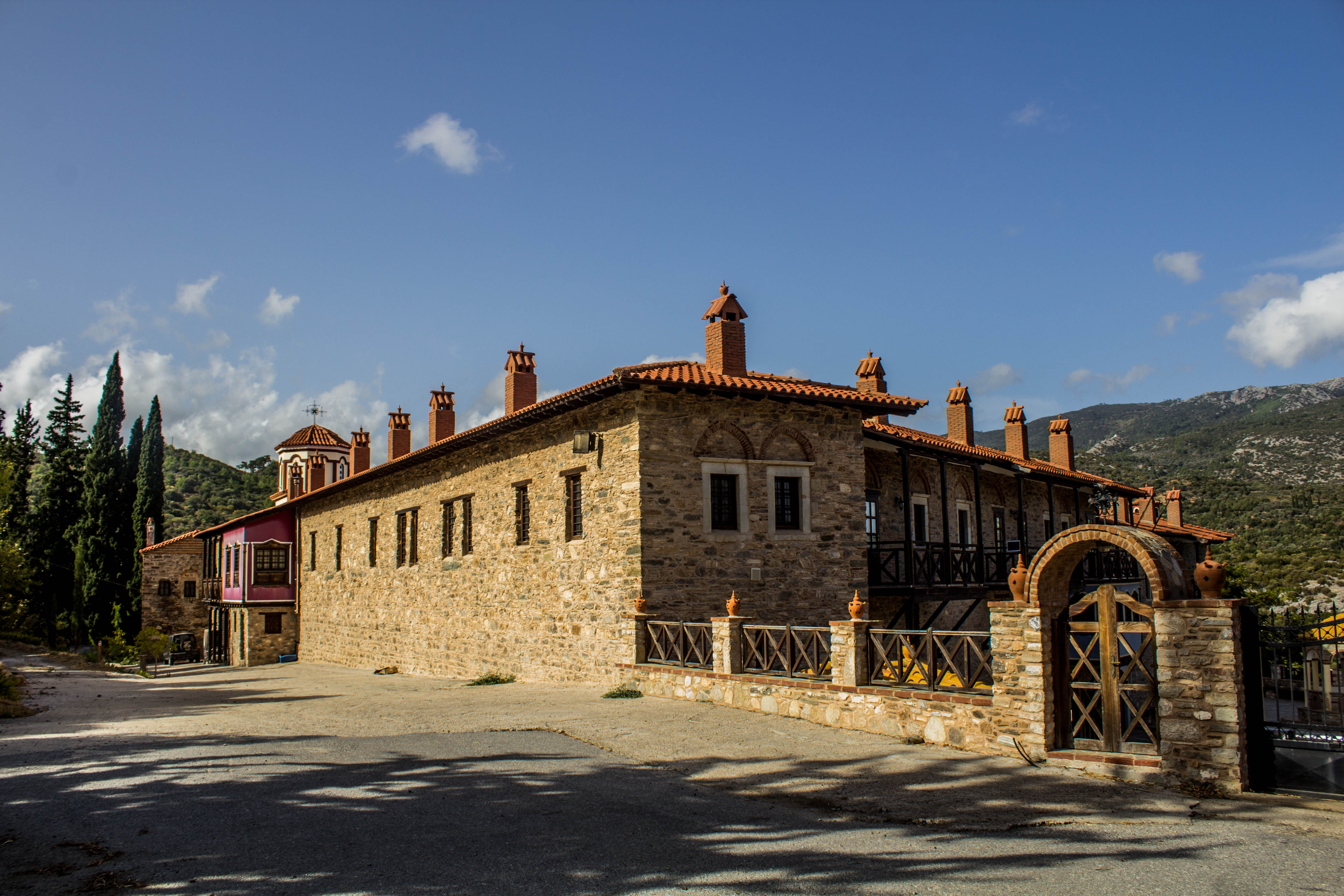
- Interactive map of Megali Panagia Monastery

Monastery information
- Established: 1586
- Dedicated to: Dormition of Theotokos
- Celebration date: August 23
- Diocese: Metropolis of Samos, Ikaria and Korseon

Site
- Location: Koumaradaioi, Samos
- Country: Greece
- Coordinates: 37°41′44″N 26°50′32″E

The Megali Panagia Monastery (Greek: Μονή Μεγάλης Παναγίας) or "Five Houses" is an Orthodox monastery in Samos and belongs to Metropolis of Samos, Ikaria and Korseon.

== Location and history ==
The Monastery of Megali Panagia is located towards the central/southern part of the island, 2 km southeast of Koumaradaioi while it is about 24 km W.-SW. from Samos (town) and 25 km SE. from Karlovasi. It was founded in 1586 by the monks Nilos and Dionysios, who had monasticized on Mount Latmos in Asia Minor near the ancient Miletus.

Its architecture follows, in terms of its structure, the type of the traditional four-sided orthodox monastery. In the center of the courtyard is the catholicon, which is considered the greatest and most overwhelming of all the temples of Samos. It is a Byzantine-style church with a dome and is an accurate assessment of the "cruciform inscribed compound tetrakonion Athenian church with narthex, exonarthex and chapel".

Particularly noteworthy are its frescoes (16th century), the gilded wood-carved despotic throne and the iconostasis (18th century). He celebrates on August 23.

It is listed separately as a settlement, for the first time, in 1940 in the community of Koumaradaioi.
