= Church of Panagia Chalkeon =

11th-century Byzantine church and UNESCO World Heritage site in Thessaloniki, Greece

- Παναγία τῶν Χαλκέων
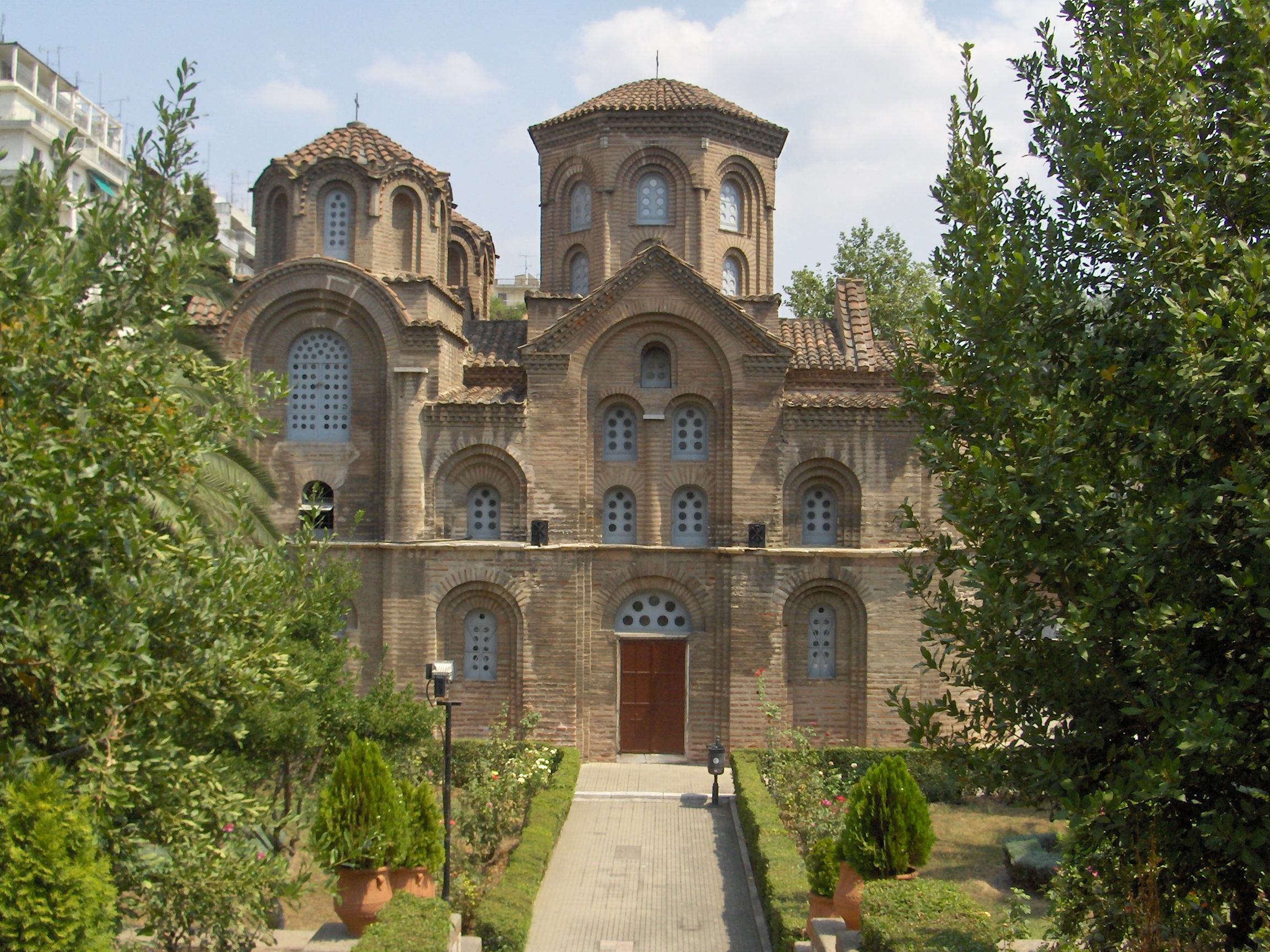
- Exterior of the church in 2007

- Location of the church in Greece
- Church of Panagia Chalkeon
- 40°38′13″N 22°56′37″E
- Location: Dikastirion Square, Thessaloniki, Central Macedonia
- Country: Greece
- Language: Greek
- Denomination: Greek Orthodox
- Previous denomination: Islam (c. 1430–1912)

History
- Former name(s): Turkish: Kazancilar Camii (as a mosque)
- Status: Katholikon (1028–c. 1430); Mosque (c. 1430–1912); Church (since 1912– )
- Founder(s): Christopher, katepano of Longobardia
- Dedication: Virgin Mary

Architecture
- Functional status: Active
- Architectural type: Church
- Style: Byzantine
- Completed: 1028 CE

Specifications
- Materials: Bricks; marble

Administration
- Metropolis: Thessaloniki

Clergy
- Priest: Fr. Klimanoglou Dionusios
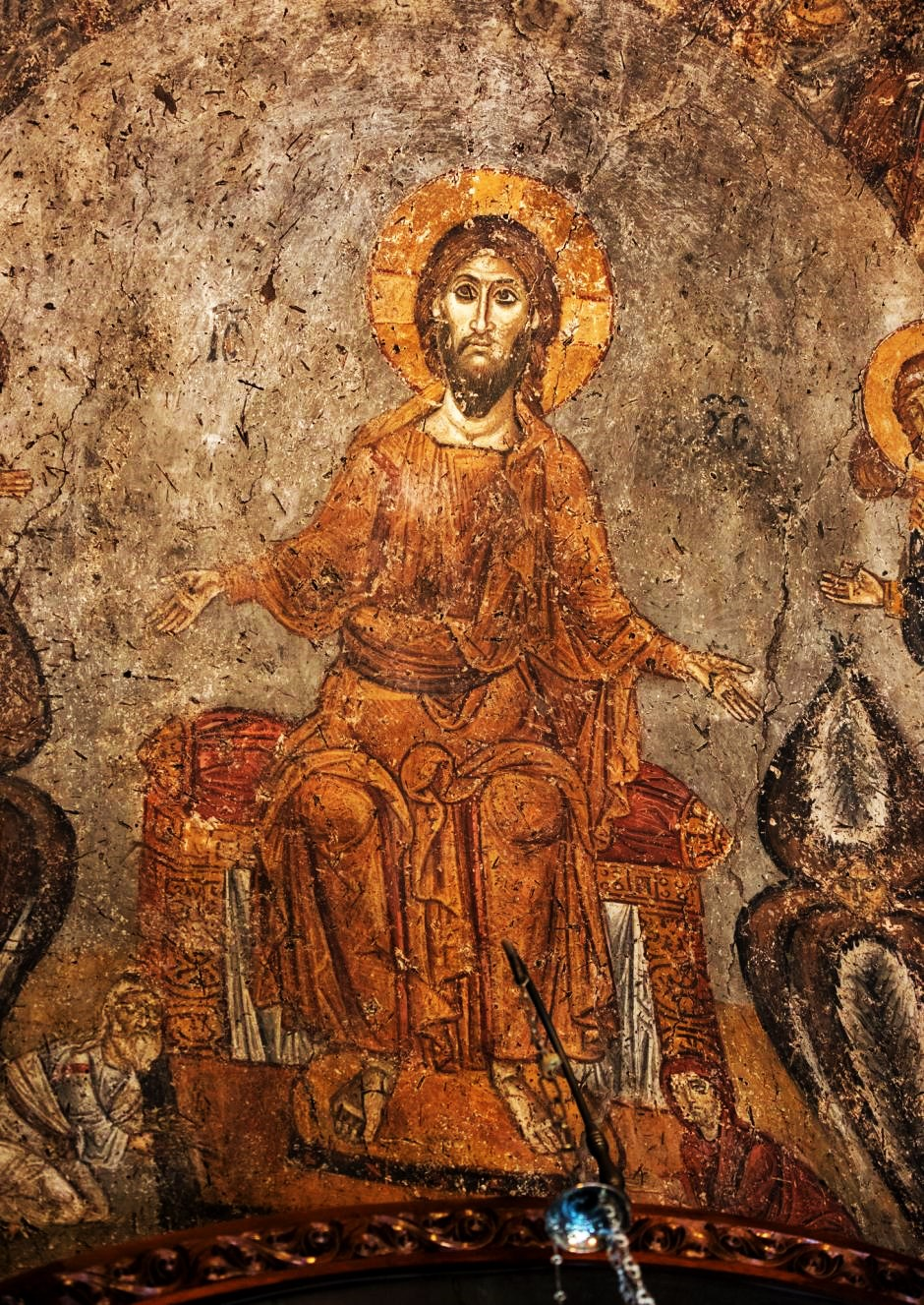
- 14th-century fresco inside the church

UNESCO World Heritage Site
- Part of: Paleochristian and Byzantine monuments of Thessaloniki
- Criteria: Cultural: (i), (ii), (iv)
- Reference: 456-007
- Inscription: 1988 (12th Session)
- Area: 0.249 ha (0.62 acres)

The Church of Panagia Chalkeon (Greek: Παναγία τῶν Χαλκέων) is an 11th-century Byzantine-era Greek Orthodox church in the city of Thessaloniki, in the Central Macedonia region of northern Greece. Because of its outstanding Byzantine mosaics and architecture, and its testimony to the importance of Thessaloniki in early and medieval Christianity, the church is one of fifteen structures inscribed on the UNESCO World Heritage List as the Paleochristian and Byzantine monuments of Thessaloniki. The church was converted to a mosque in the 15th century, during the Ottoman era, and subsequently reconsecrated as a church in the 20th century.

== Location ==
The church is located at Dikastirion Square, north of the Via Egnatia at the point where it crosses Aristotelous Avenue, which leads to Aristotelous Square. The archaeological site of the city's Roman forum is located northeast, while its name, which translates as "the Virgin of the Copper-smiths", derives from its proximity to the area traditionally occupied by the city's coppersmiths.

== History ==
According to the founder's inscription above the west entrance, the church was built in 1028 by the protospatharios Christopher, katepano of Longobardia, and his wife, son, and two daughters. The inscription reads:

This once profane place is dedicated as an eminent church to the Mother of God by Christopher, the most illustrious royal protospatharios and governor of Lagouvardia, and his wife Maria, and their children Nicephorus, Anna, and Catacale, in the month of September, indiction XII, in the year 6537. (Note: The Byzantine Calendar year 6537 AM is equivalent to the year 1028 CE.)

Christopher's tomb was probably located in an arcosolium on the church's northern wall.

With the conquest of the city in 1430 by the Ottoman Turks, the church was turned into a mosque, named in Turkish: Kazancilar Camii, lit. 'Mosque of the Cauldron-Merchants'. It served as a mosque until the end of the Ottoman occupation in 1912. The building underwent a restoration in 1934 following the Chalkidiki earthquakes of 1932.

== Architecture ==
=== Exterior ===
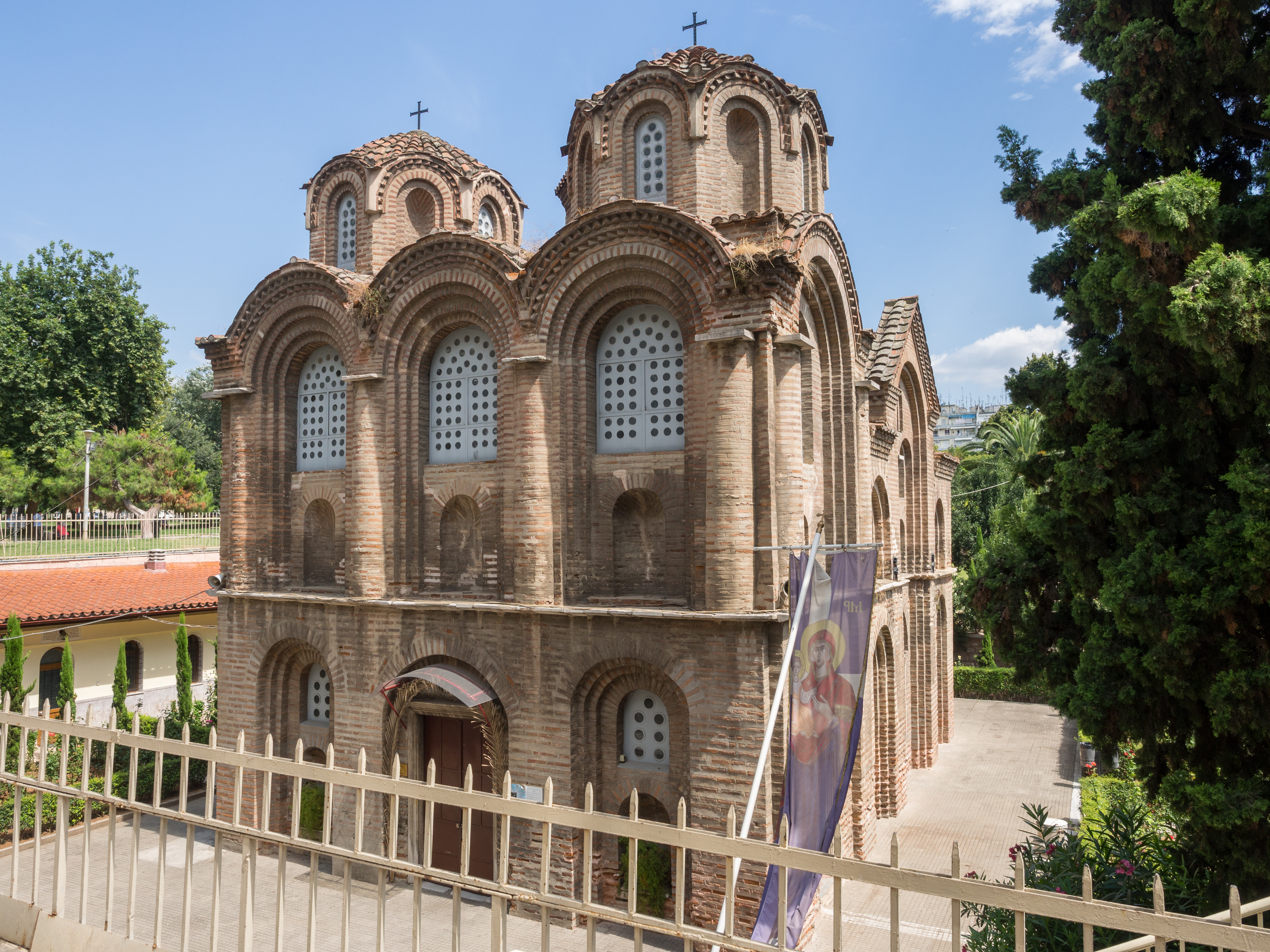
West view

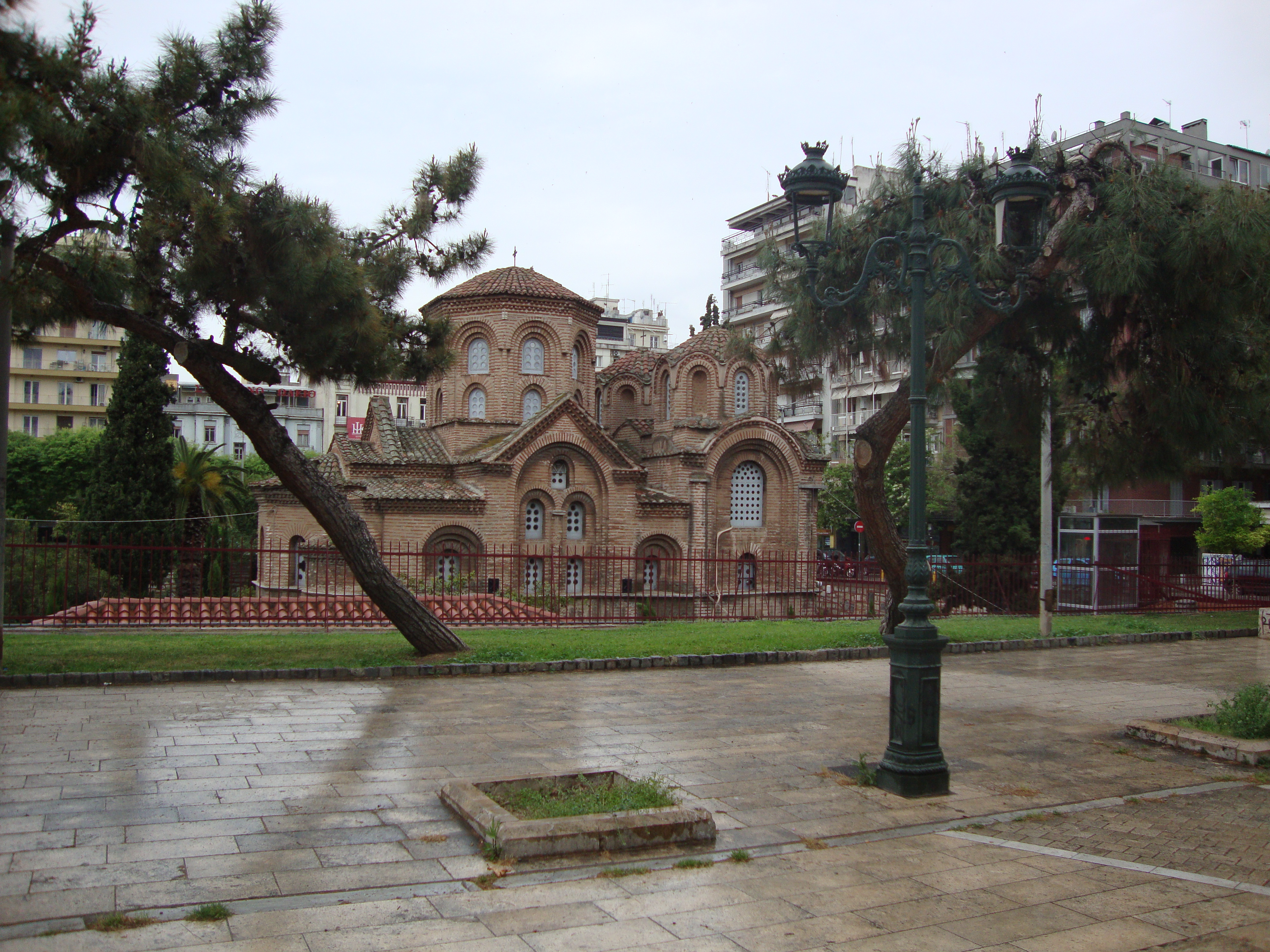
View from the street

The ground plan is that of a classic "cross-in-square-form" typical of Macedonian-period architecture, with four columns and three domes, one central and two over the narthex. The entire building is built of bricks, which gave it the popular nickname "Red Church" (Κόκκινη Εκκλησιά). The exterior is enlivened with a variety of arches and pilasters, elements which can be traced to Constantinopolitan influence. The use of arches with several setbacks gives the building a "sculpted" appearance. A marble cornice runs around the whole church, giving the building distinctive upper and lower sections. The lower section is more spare, while the upper section is decoratively distinguished by half-columns between arches, and saw-tooth courses where the wall meets the roof.

=== Interior ===
The interior of the church is divided into three sections: The narthex, the naos (the central square of a ‘cross-in-square’ plan), and the sanctuary.

The narthex is covered by three barrel vaults and has an upper gallery that was perhaps used as a sacristy. There was never, however, a stair leading up to it. Anna Tsitouridou speculates that it may have been accessed by a ladder through a now closed up arched window on the northwest corner of the church.

In the naos, four light grey marble columns form a square and support the arches of the four barrel-vaults that make up the arms of the cross going out. In the center of the square is the dome. Pendentives between the arches create a circular base for the dome above. The dome is 3.8 metres (12 ft) wide and it is 5.3 metres (17 ft) high. It is octagonal, containing sixteen windows in two rows, one atop the other. The arms of the cross can be clearly seen on the exterior, with saddle back roofs over their great barrel vaults, and triangular pediments emphasising their ends. Domical vaults cover the four bays between the arms of the cross, completing the square of the naos.

Though founders' tombs are usually placed in the narthex of their churches, at Panagia Chalkeon the tomb believed to be Christopher the founder's is found in a niche (an arcosolium) in the north wall of the naos.

The sanctuary is divided into three sections: The central main body of the sanctuary, the prothesis, and the diaconicon. The central section of the sanctuary has a wide apse, which is “semicircular within, and three-sided without.” The other two bays have apses “semicircular inside and out.” The church has some anomalies; the north wall is slightly longer than the south wall, and the four central columns do not form a perfect square.

=== Sculptural decoration ===
There is sculptural decoration on the capitals of the four columns in the naos, and the doorframes of the narthex.

The column capitals are decorated with reliefs of laurel leaves and knot patterns which contain crosses and rosettes in them. The lintel of the royal door leading from the narthex into the naos is decorated with a twisting band design, forming squares and circles in relief. The circles contain rosettes and it is discernible that crosses used to be in the squares, but have been scraped off.

=== Paintings ===
The walls were originally covered with paintings, but the majority of the paintings have fallen down, and few of the remaining paintings are in good condition. The paintings are from the time the church was built, except a few from the 14th century whose remnants can be viewed on the west wall.

According to Sharon Gerstel, “The church of Panagia ton Chalkeon ... preserves one of the earliest multi-register sanctuary programs in Macedonia.”

In the conch of the apse stands the Virgin Orant flanked by two archangels. Two registers below, in the bottom register of the sanctuary, are four half-length depictions of "anargyroi," or “unmercenaries”: healers who refused payment for their healing services. According to Gerstel, the presence of non-episcopal figures in the bema dates the iconographical program to "a period when a wider variety of saints could be located in the sanctuary.”

Inscribed on the eastern arch of the church are these words (here translated into English based on Paul Speck's reconstruction of the quote):

“Beholding the altar of the Lord, Stand trembling, O man!
For within, Christ is sacrificed daily.
And the powers of incorporeal angels, ministering,
Circle around [the altar] in fear.”

This message borders a depiction of the apostles taking the last supper, which is the earliest extant representation of the scene in the bema of a Byzantine church. In this version of the last supper, the offering of the bread is painted on the south wall of the bema, and the offering of the wine (mostly ruined) on the north wall opposite. This in effect, according to Gerstel, engulfs the altar and the celebrant and equates “the priest with Christ as the giver of the sacrifice.”

In the main dome there is a departure from the standard Byzantine iconographical program. Rather than the usual Pantocrator, there is a painting of Christ's ascension. Anna Tsitouridou posits this choice could be related to the church being built to house the tomb of its founder, and that therefore eschatological imagery was used.

The barrel vaults and walls above the cornice of the naos were originally decorated with a Christological cycle, but very little remains to the present day. Some of the best preserved portions are the Nativity and the Presentation in the Temple.

In the narthex the walls are painted with the Last Judgment, with Christ the Judge seated above the royal door into the naos. Again, Anna Tsitouridou associates the prominence of the final judgment with the funerary nature of the monument.

Overall the figures that can still be seen in the Panagia Chalkeon are characterized by symmetry, flatness, heavy dark lines, extensive shading, and a great range of colours. Technique wise, the wall paintings were mostly done in fresco, only the facial details being done in secco.

== See also ==
- Ancient Roman and Byzantine domes
- Islam in Greece
- List of Eastern Orthodox church buildings in Greece
- List of former mosques in Greece
- Ottoman Greece
