= Kiti, Cyprus =

Kiti Κίτι
- Village and Municipal District
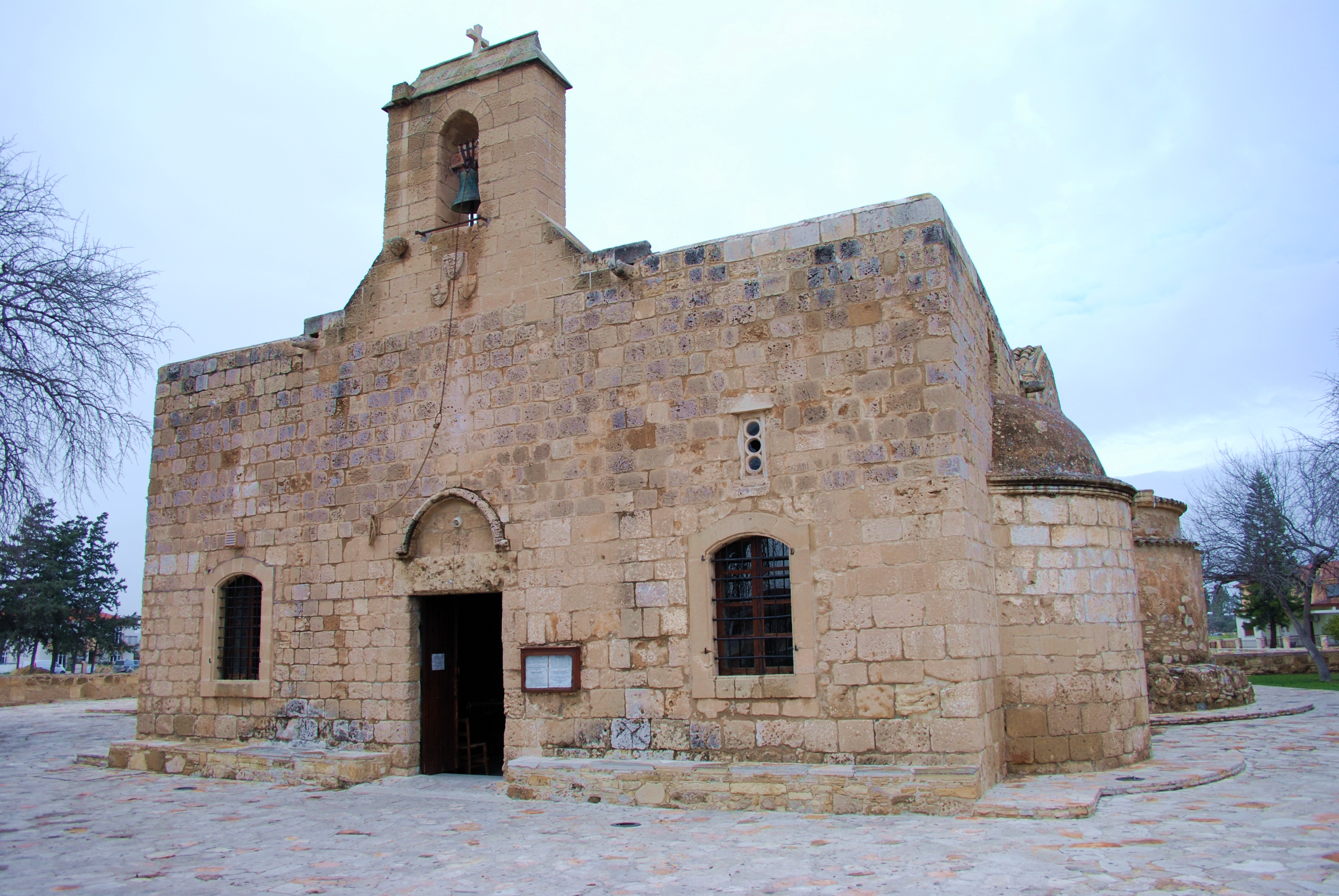
- Panagia Angeloktisti Church

- Location in Cyprus
- Coordinates: 34°50′50″N 33°34′19″E
- Country: Cyprus
- District: Larnaca District
- Municipality: Dromolaxia–Meneou Municipality

Population (2021)
  - Total: 5,136
- Time zone: UTC+2 (EET)
  - Summer (DST): UTC+3 (EEST)

Kiti (Greek: Κίτι [locally [ˈt͡ʃiti]]; Turkish: Çite) is a village and a municipal district of the Dromolaxia–Meneou Municipality in the Larnaca District of Cyprus, located 11 km southwest of Larnaca. It is noted for the Byzantine church Panagia tis Angeloktistis (Greek: Παναγία της Αγγελόκτιστης) or Panagia Angeloktisti ("Panagia Built by Angels"). According to local tradition, the residents of ancient Kition (now Larnaca) moved to Kiti in order to escape the Arab invasions. They decided to build the church, but according to tradition, the foundation of church moved overnight. According to legend, an army of angels came overnight to build the church, which is where it gets its name.

== Climate ==
The climate in this area is described by the Köppen Climate Classification System as "dry-summer subtropical" often referred to as "Mediterranean" and abbreviated as Csa.
