= Kivides =

Kivides may refer to:

- Kato Kivides, a village in Cyprus
- Pano Kivides, a village in Cyprus
