= Prastio =

Prastio (Greek: Πραστιό) is the name of several villages in Cyprus:

- Prastio (Avdimou), north of Avdimou, in Limassol District
- Prastio, Famagusta
- Prastio (Kellaki), north of Parekklisia, in Limassol District
- Prastio, Nicosia, west of the town of Morphou
- Prastio, Paphos, east of Paphos on the Diarizos river
