= Dierona =

Dierona Διερώνα
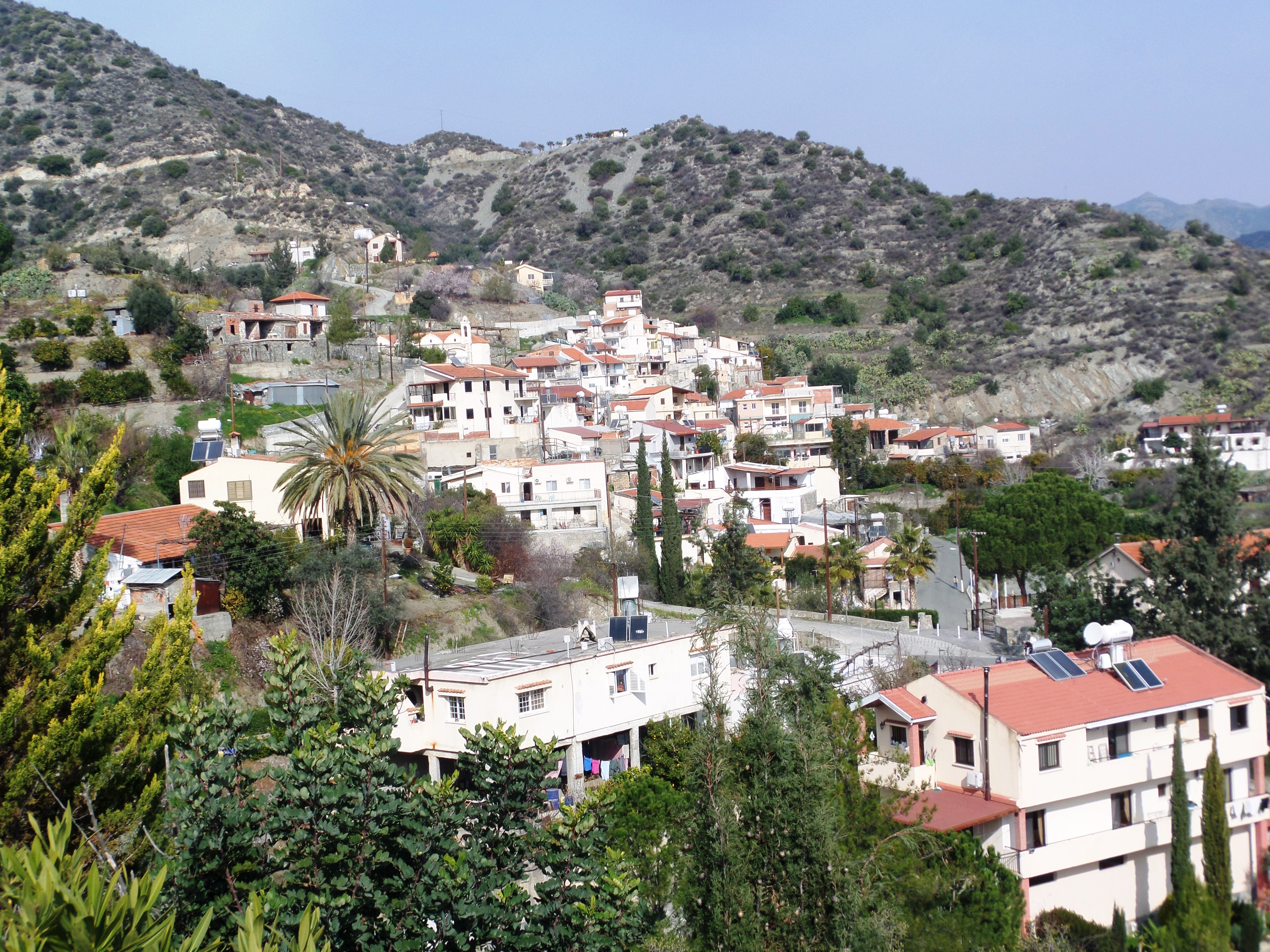

- Location in Cyprus
- Coordinates: 34°49′49″N 33°6′40″E
- Country: Cyprus
- District: Limassol District

Population (2001)
  - Total: 258
- Time zone: UTC+2 (EET)
  - Summer (DST): UTC+3 (EEST)

Dierona (Greek: Διερώνα) is a semi-mountainous village in the Limassol District of Cyprus, located 2 km south of Arakapas at the foothills of the Troodos Mountains.

The population, at the last count, is just over 250 people.

The village is close to the Wine Routes in the Commandaria area and stands at an altitude of 461 metres (1512.47 feet).

It has an arched Venetian Dierona Bridge, the Church of Archangel Michael and mandarin orange orchards, walnut trees and wooded mountainscape.

The village is equidistant between the mountains and the seaside at Amathus in Limassol, and easily reachable by a modern dual-lane road.

There is a Golf and Country Club in nearby Vikla.
