= Limassol District =

District of Cyprus

Limassol District Επαρχία Λεμεσού (Greek) Limasol Kazası (Turkish)
- District
- Location of the district in Cyprus (in red)
- Coordinates: 34°40′44″N 33°02′38″E
- Country: Cyprus
- Capital: Limassol

Area
  - District: 1,393.3 km^{2} (538.0 sq mi)
- (Note: Including Akrotiri.)

Population (2021)
  - District: 262,238
  - Rank: 2nd
  - Density: 188.21/km^{2} (487.47/sq mi)
  - Urban: 198,558
  - Rural: ~63,680
- Time zone: UTC+2 (EET)
  - Summer (DST): UTC+3 (EEST)
- Post code: 3000–4999
- Area code: +357 25

The Limassol District, (Note: Greek: Επαρχία Λεμεσού, romanized: Eparkhía Lemesoú [/éparxía lemesú/]; Turkish: Limasol Kazası) simply known as Limassol (Note: /ˈlɪməsɒl/) or Lemesos, (Note: Greek: Λεμεσός, romanized: Lemesos [/lemesós/]; Turkish: Leymosun or Limasol) is one of the six districts of Cyprus. As of 2021, it had a population of 262,238, 75,7% of which was urban. The district's capital city is Limassol. Part of the British Overseas Territory of Akrotiri and Dhekelia forms an enclave on the Akrotiri Peninsula, under the sovereignty of the SBA (Sovereign Base Areas Administration).

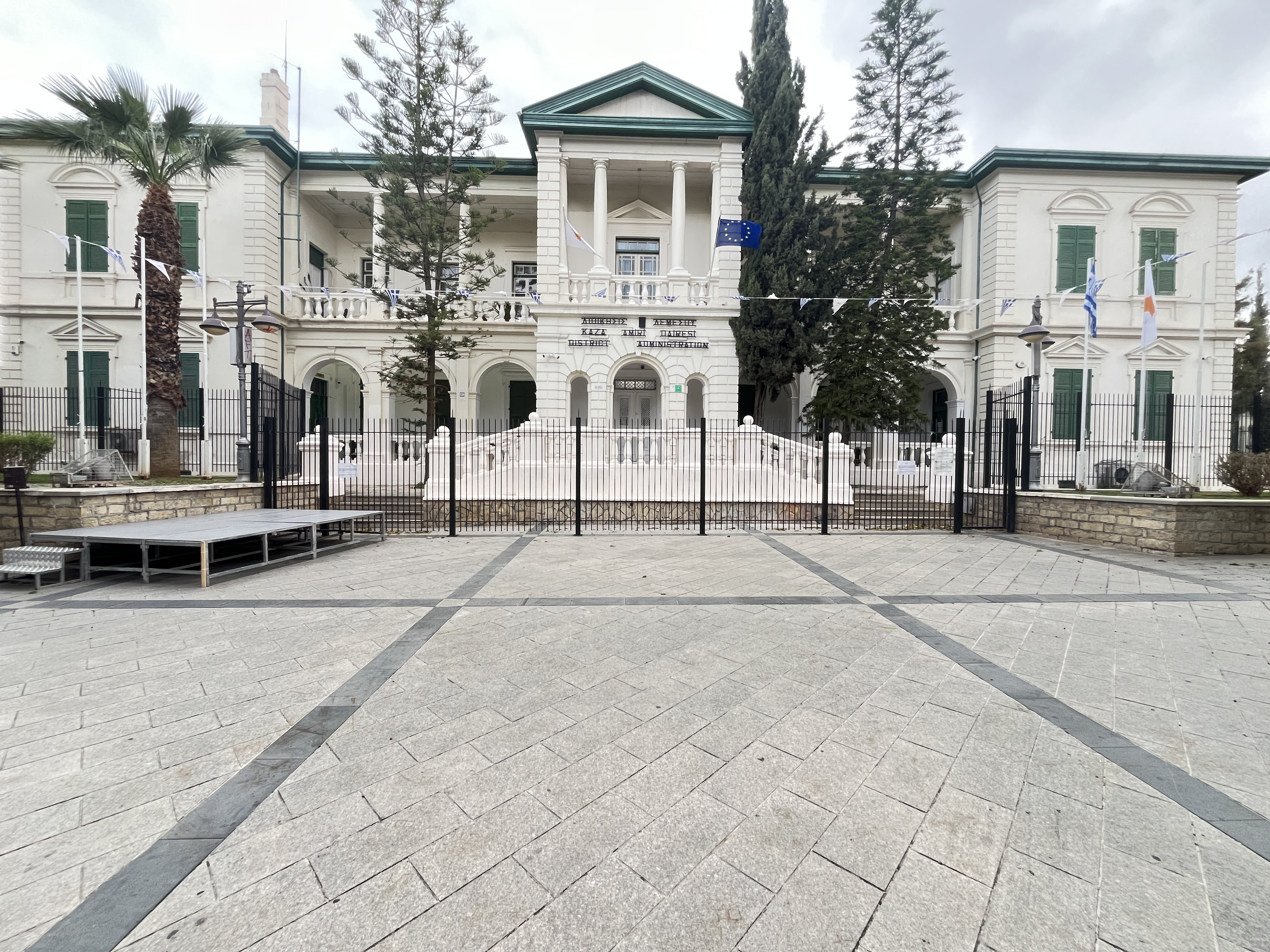
The District Administration building, on Anexartisias Street

== History ==
The buried ancient city of Amathus is 11 kilometres (6.8 mi) from Limassol. Archaeological excavations have unearthed ruins of the Byzantine period and a tomb of the 7th century BC. The ancient Kolossi Castle, which is located 9 kilometres (5.6 mi) to the west of Limassol, reflects the fall of Acre and history of the Templars and their confiscated property allotted to the Limassol District for cultivation of wine and sugarcane.

== Geography ==
Limassol District is the southwestern-central part of Cyprus. The Kouris River rises in the southern slopes of Troodos Mountains, which lie in the northern part of the district towards the centre of Cyprus, and flows to the sea near the ancient city of Kourion. This river has been dammed by the Kouris Dam, which has caused the near drying up of the river in its lower reaches. Limassol, to the northeast of the Akrotiri peninsula which contains the Limassol Salt Lake, lies on Akrotiri Bay, while Pissouri, to the northwest of the peninsula, lies on Episkopi Bay. Episkopi Bay is a nesting ground for green and loggerhead turtles, both of which are on the IUCN list of endangered species. Amathous Beach, Dassoudi Beach and part of Governor's Beach are also situated in the district.

== Settlements ==
According to Statistical Codes of Municipalities, Communities and Quarters of Cyprus per the Statistical Service of Cyprus (2015), Limassol District has 6 municipalities and 106 communities. Municipalities are written with bold.

1. Agios Amvrosios, Limassol
2. Agios Athanasios, Cyprus
3. Agios Dimitrios, Cyprus
4. Agios Georgios, Limassol
5. Agios Ioannis, Limassol
6. Agios Konstantinos, Cyprus
7. Agios Mamas, Limassol
8. Agios Pavlos, Cyprus
9. Agios Theodoros, Limassol
10. Agios Therapon
11. Agios Thomas, Cyprus
12. Agios Tychonas
13. Agridia
14. Agros, Cyprus
15. Akapnou
16. Akrotiri (village)
17. Akrounta
18. Alassa
19. Alektora
20. Amiantos
21. Anogyra
22. Apesia
23. Apsiou
24. Arakapas
25. Armenochori, Cyprus
26. Arsos, Limassol
27. Asgata
28. Asomatos, Limassol
29. Avdimou
30. Chandria
31. Dierona
32. Dora, Cyprus
33. Doros, Cyprus
34. Dymes
35. Episkopi, Limassol
36. Eptagoneia
37. Erimi
38. Fasoula, Limassol
39. Foini
40. Foinikaria
41. Gerasa, Cyprus
42. Germasogeia
43. Gerovasa
44. Kalo Chorio, Limassol
45. Kaminaria
46. Kantou, Cyprus
47. Kapilio
48. Kato Kivides
49. Kato Mylos
50. Kato Platres
51. Kato Polemidia
52. Kellaki
53. Kissousa
54. Klonari
55. Koilani
56. Kolossi
57. Korfi
58. Kouka, Cyprus
59. Kyperounta
60. Laneia
61. Lemithou
62. Limassol
63. Limnatis, Limassol
64. Lofou
65. Louvaras
66. Malia, Cyprus
67. Mandria, Limassol
68. Mathikoloni
69. Mesa Geitonia
70. Monagri
71. Monagroulli
72. Moni, Cyprus
73. Moniatis
74. Mouttagiaka
75. Omodos
76. Pachna
77. Palaiomylos
78. Palodeia
79. Pano Kivides
80. Pano Polemidia
81. Paramali
82. Paramytha
83. Parekklisia
84. Pelendri
85. Pentakomo
86. Pera Pedi
87. Pissouri
88. Platanisteia
89. Platres
90. Potamiou
91. Potamitissa
92. Prastio (Avdimou)
93. Prastio (Kellaki)
94. Prodromos, Cyprus
95. Pyrgos, Limassol
96. Sanida
97. Silikou
98. Sotira, Limassol
99. Souni–Zanatzia
100. Spitali
101. Sykopetra
102. Trachoni, Limassol
103. Treis Elies
104. Trimiklini
105. Troodos (community)
106. Tserkezoi
107. Vasa Kellakiou
108. Vasa Koilaniou
109. Vikla
110. Vouni
111. Ypsonas
112. Zoopigi

== Quarters ==
The municipalities of Limassol, for administrative purposes, are divided into quarters. An exception is the Ypsonas Municipality. The list below shows alphabetically the quarters per municipality.

Agios Athanasios Municipality

- Agios Athanasios
- Apostolos Loukas
- Agios Georgiou Fragkoudi
- Agios Stylianos

Germasogeia Municipality

- Agia Paraskevi
- Potamos Germasogeias

Kato Polemidia Municipality

- Archangelou Michael
- Anthoupolis
- Apostolos Varnavas
- Makarios
- Agios Nikolaos
- Panayias Evaggelistrias

Limassol Municipality

- Agia Zoni
- Agia Napa
- Agia Trias
- Agia Fyla
- Agios Antonios
- Agios Georgiou
- Agios Ioannis
- Agios Nektarios
- Agios Nikolaos
- Agios Spiridonas
- Petrou Kai Pavlou
- Apostolos Andreas
- Arnaoutogeitonia
- Zakaki
- Κatholiki
- Kapsalos
- Neapolis
- Omonoia
- Panayias Evaggelistrias
- Tzami Tzentit
- Tsiflikoudia

Mesa Geitonia Municipality

- Kontovathkia
- Panthea
- Prodromos
- Halkoutsa
- Forsen
- Wesker
- Beahm
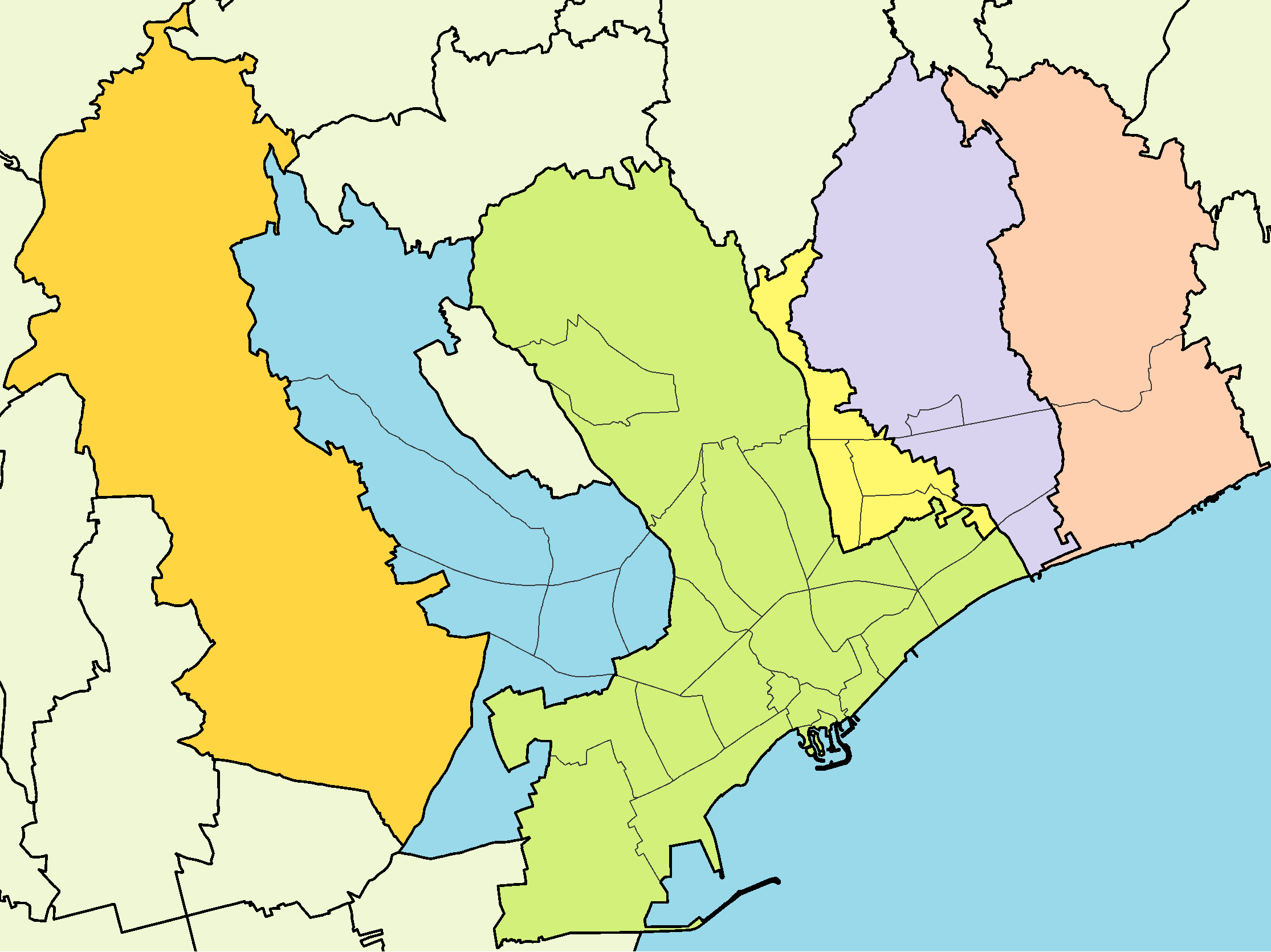
The municipalities of Limassol and their quarters.

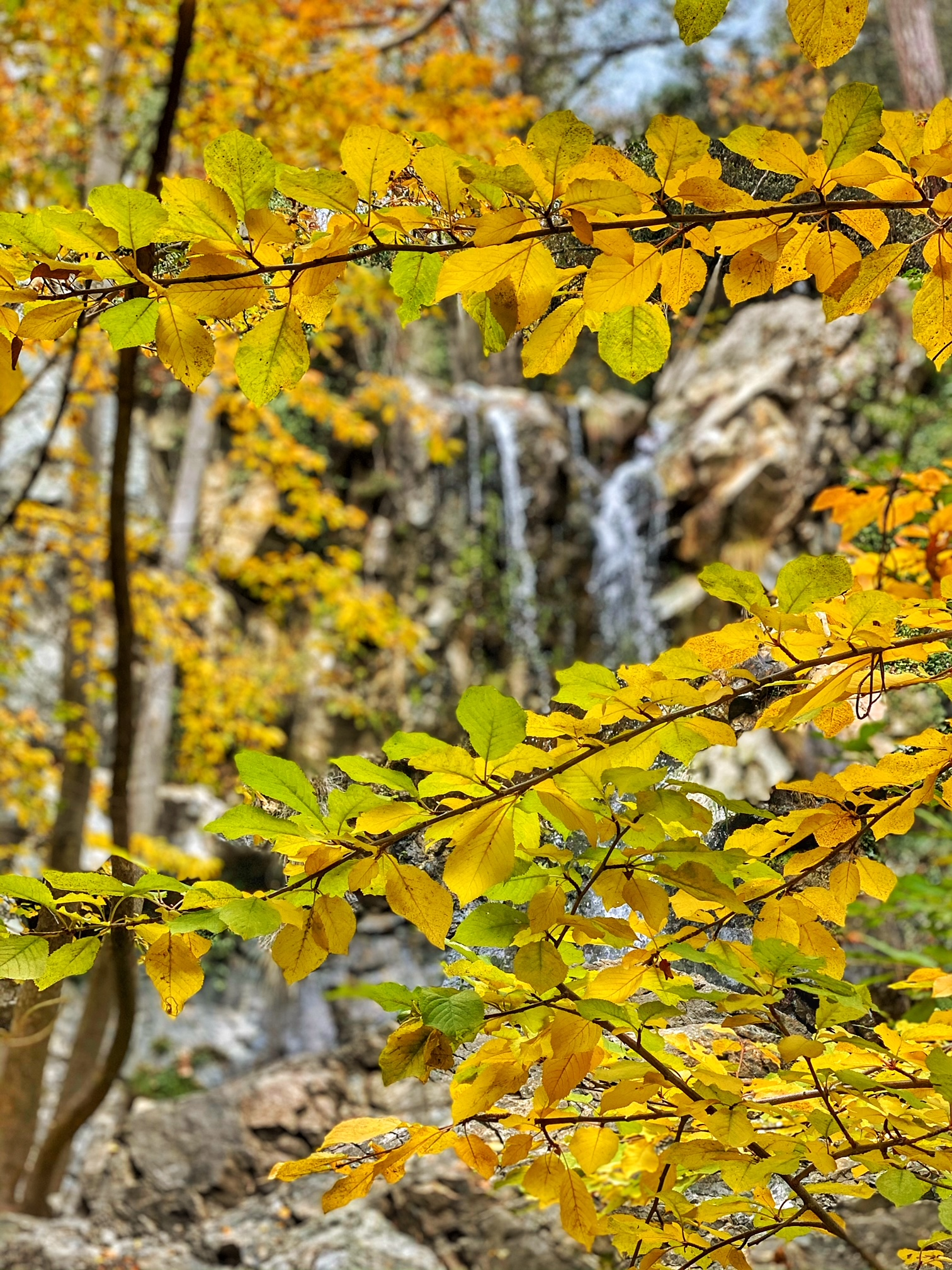
Caledonian Waterfalls, Limassol. Cyprus

== Landmarks ==
Limassol, as the regional capital and a major centre for European tourism, contains many of the administrative and cultural buildings, and a large number of hotels along the seafront. Limassol District Court is located on Lord Byron Avenue near the Limassol city centre. It consists of a court complex with multiple buildings. The city is known for its wineries, and revelry and nightlife. The Limassol District Archaeological Museum, located in Limassol, has historical artefacts from the towns of Kourion and Amathus. The collections cover several periods, including Preneolithic (Akroteri culture), Early Neolithic (Shillourokambos culture), Neolithic I, Neolithic II (Sotira culture), Chalcolithic (Baj culture), Erimi Culture, Early Bronze Age, Μiddle Bronze Age, Late Bronze Age, Cypro-Geometric period, Cypro-Archaic period, Cypro-Classical period, Hellenistic period, Roman period, and Late Roman/Early Christian/Early Byzantine period. The Painted Churches in the Troödos Region is a UNESCO World Heritage Site, and one of the churches, Timios Stavros (Holy Cross) is situated in Pelendri, Limassol District.

== Bibliography ==
- Jasink, Anna Margherita; Bombardieri, Luca (2010). Researches in Cypriote History and Archaeology: Proceedings of the Meeting Held in Florence, April 29–30th 2009. Firenze University Press. ISBN 978-88-6453-134-2.
- Weiß, Waldemar; Sabo, Alexander; Peitz-Hlebec, Darja; Schwarz, Berthold (2001). Croatie – Istrie et Dalmatie: un guide de voyage actualisé. Hunter Publishing, Inc. ISBN 978-3-88618-772-0.
