= Apesia =

Apesia Aπεσιά
- Village
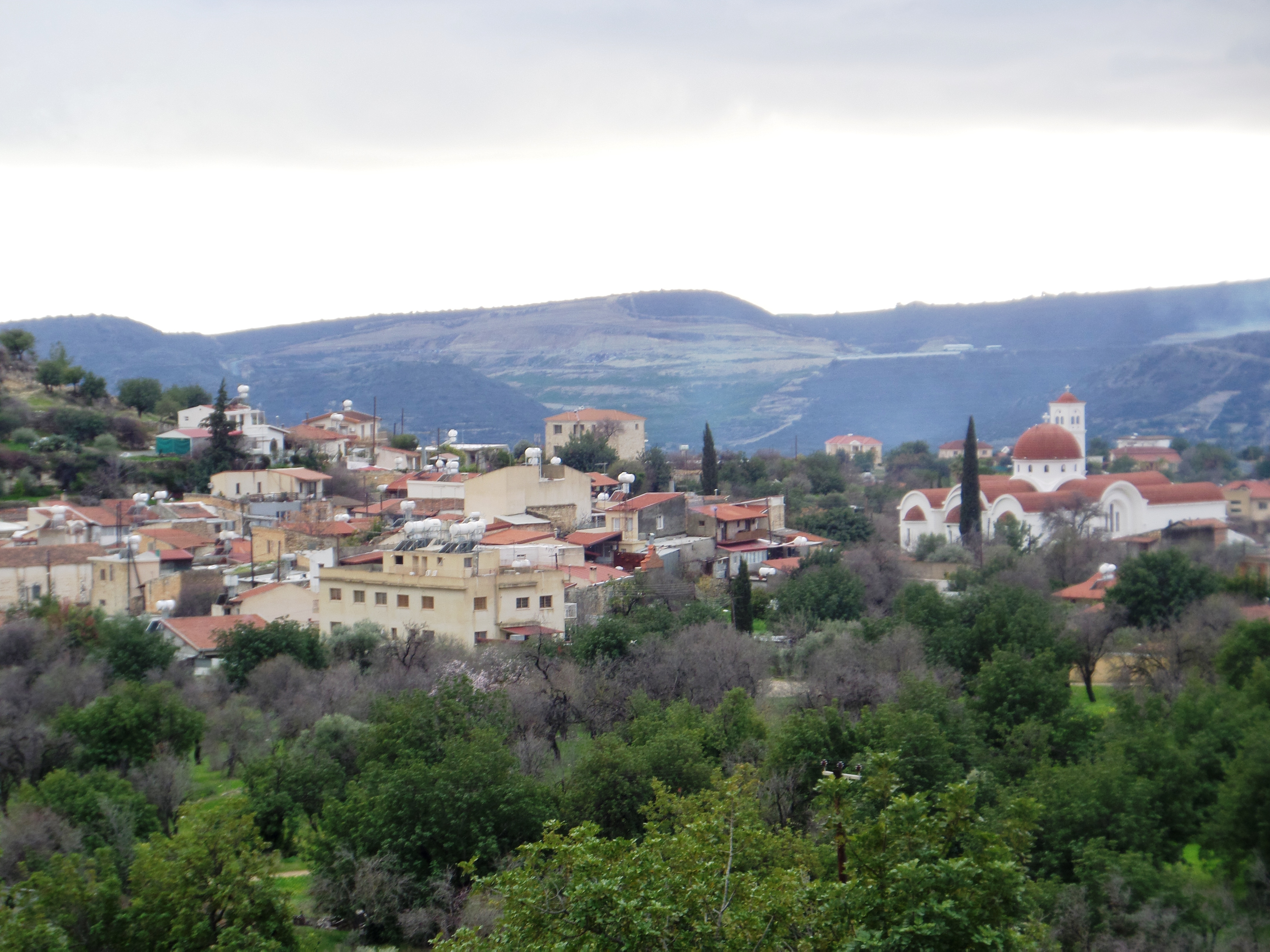

- Location in Cyprus
- Coordinates: 34°47′23″N 32°58′41″E
- Country: Cyprus
- District: Limassol District

Population (2011)
  - Total: 474
- Time zone: UTC+2 (EET)
  - Summer (DST): UTC+3 (EEST)
- Website: https://www.apesia.org.cy/

Apesia (Greek: Aπεσιά or Απαισιά) is a village in the Limassol District of Cyprus, located 3 kilometres (2 miles) southeast of Korfi.

Apesia was in the world news in October 2014 after the theft of a six million euro Degas painting was reported.
