= Anogyra =

Anogyra Ανώγυρα
- Village
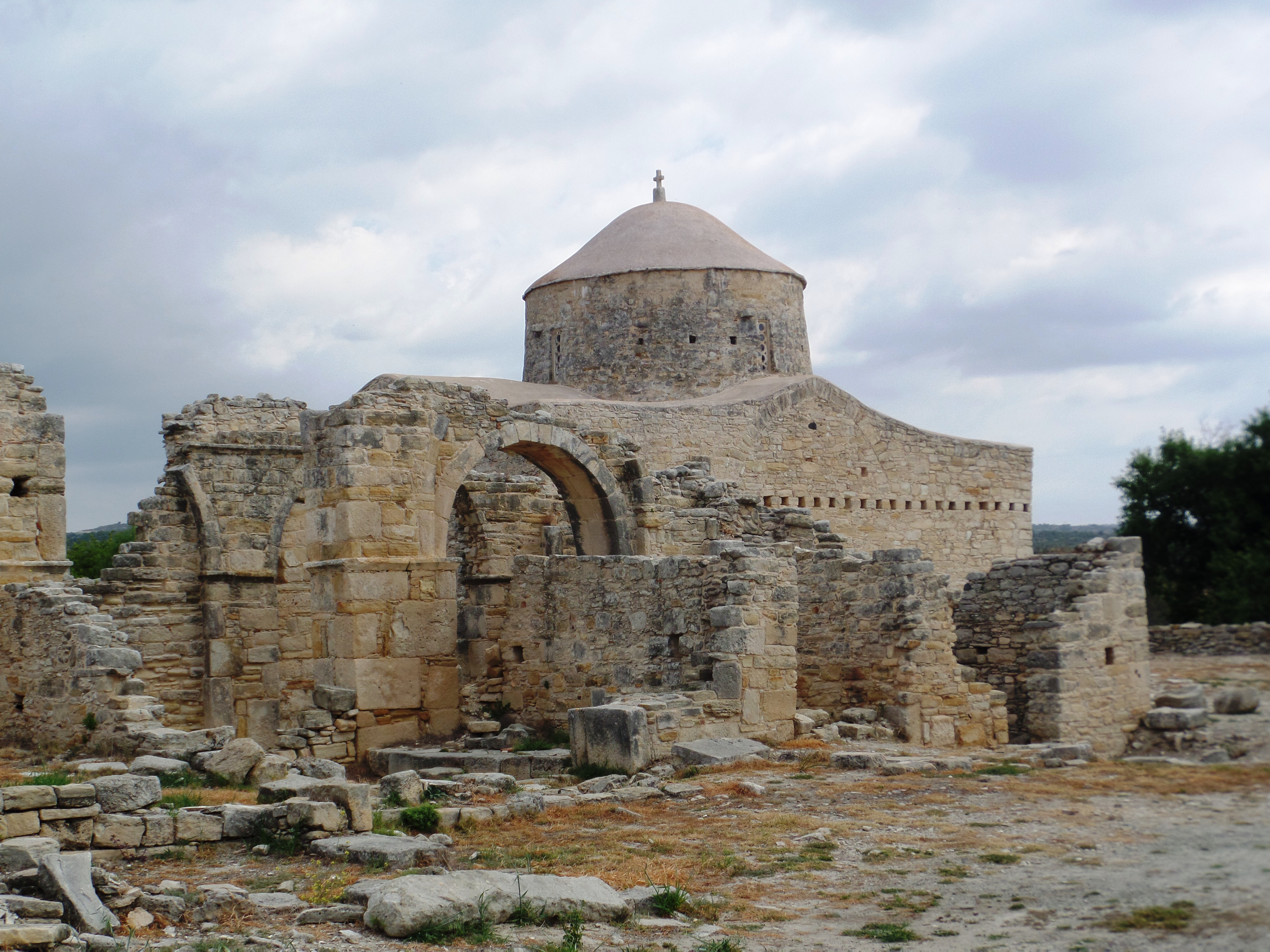

- Location in Cyprus
- Coordinates: 34°44′16″N 32°44′2″E
- Country: Cyprus
- District: Limassol District

Population (2001)
  - Total: 244
- Time zone: UTC+2 (EET)
  - Summer (DST): UTC+3 (EEST)
- Website: Official website

Anogyra (Greek: Ανώγυρα) is a village in the Limassol District of Cyprus, located 7 km (4.3 mi) north of Avdimou. The 35th Pastelli Festival in Anogyra took place on September 21, 2025, as announced in cyprusfoodmuseum.com.

== Sources ==
- Anogyra, Cyprus
- Welcome to our Village
- https://anogyravillage.cy/
- https://mills.ucy.ac.cy/28/view
