= Fasoula, Limassol =

Fasoula Φασούλα
- Village
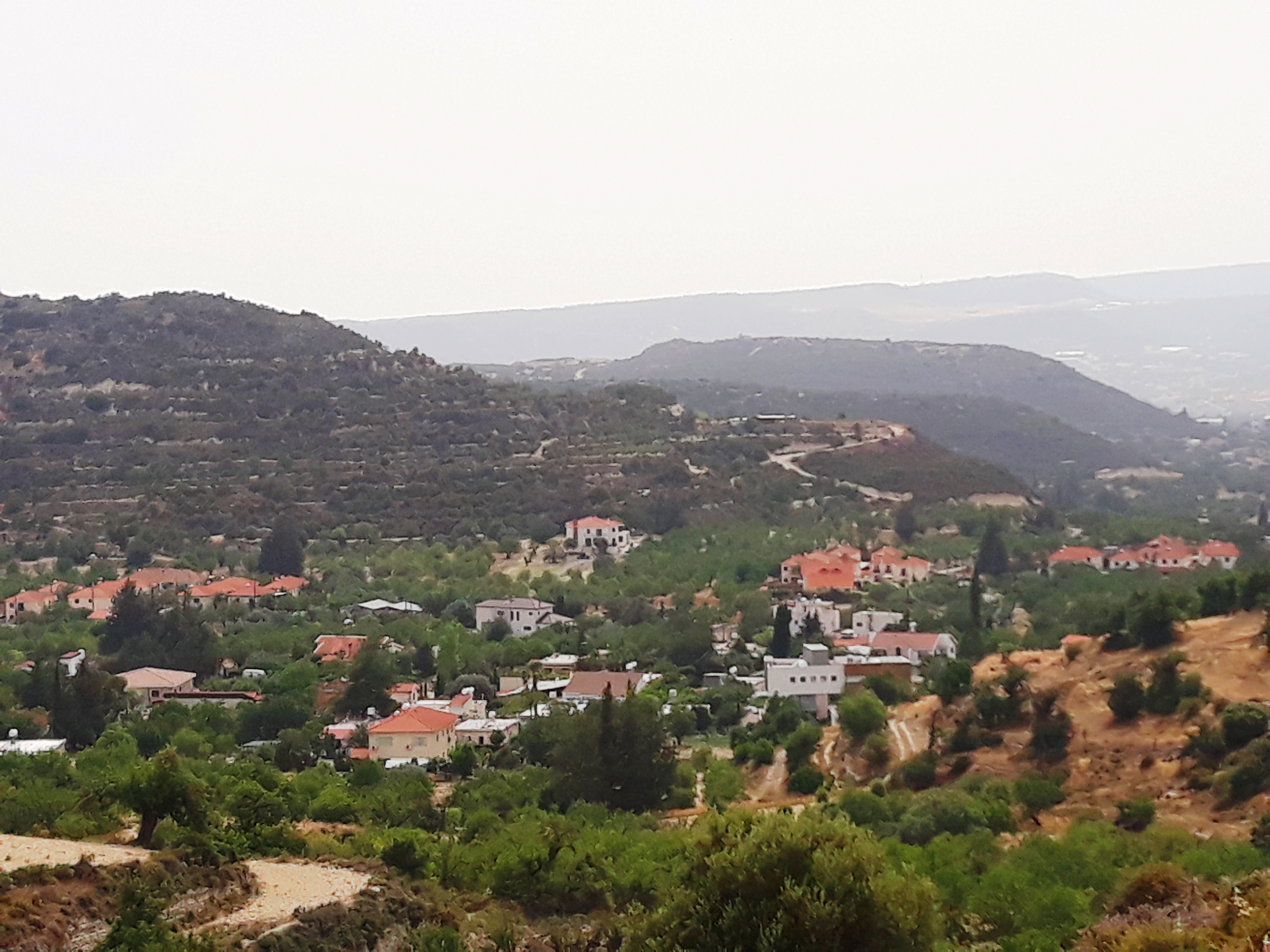

- Location in Cyprus
- Coordinates: 34°45′42″N 33°1′37″E
- Country: Cyprus
- District: Limassol District

Population (2001)
  - Total: 327
- Time zone: UTC+2 (EET)
  - Summer (DST): UTC+3 (EEST)

Fasoula (Greek: Φασούλα) is a village in the Limassol District of Cyprus, located 8 km (5 mi) north of Limassol.
