= Kato Mylos =

Kato Mylos Κάτω Μύλος
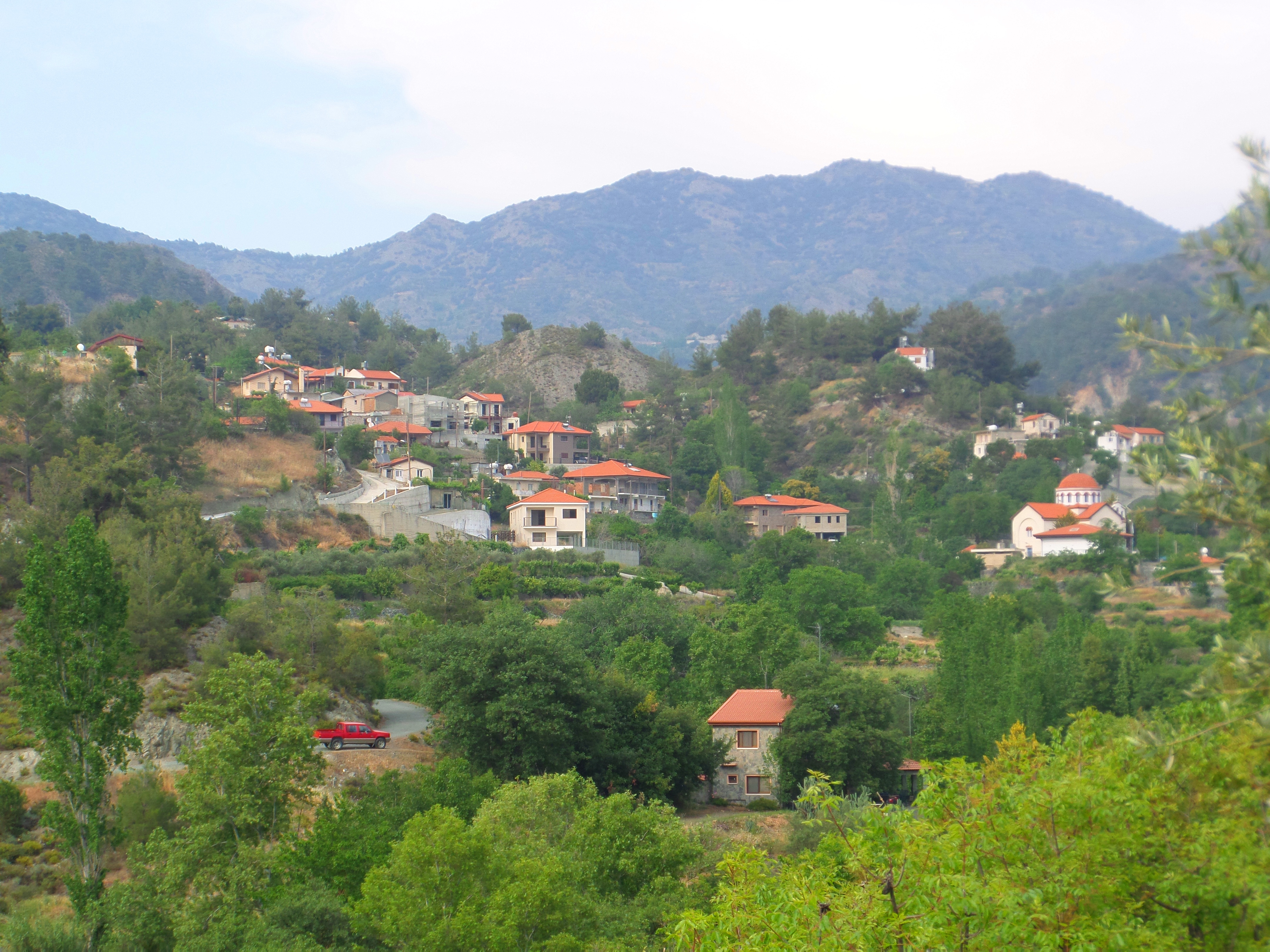

- Location in Cyprus
- Coordinates: 34°53′42″N 33°0′20″E
- Country: Cyprus
- District: Limassol District

Population (2001)
  - Total: 63
- Time zone: UTC+2 (EET)
  - Summer (DST): UTC+3 (EEST)

Kato Mylos (Greek: Κάτω Μύλος) is a village in the Limassol District of Cyprus, located east of Pelendri.
