= Dymes =

Dymes Δύμες
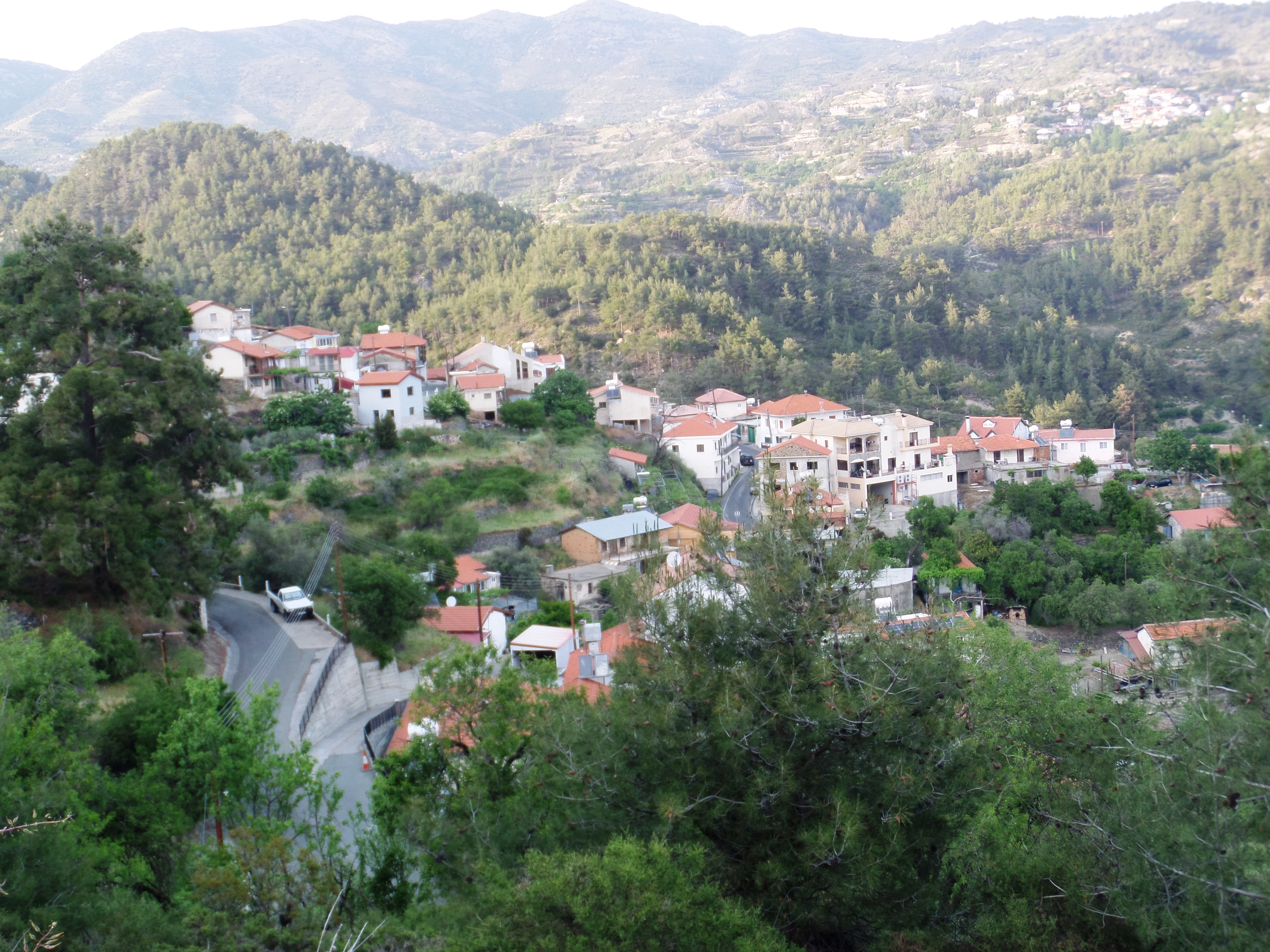

- Location in Cyprus
- Coordinates: 34°55′0″N 32°59′0″E
- Country: Cyprus
- District: Limassol District

Population (2001)
  - Total: 164
- Time zone: UTC+2 (EET)
  - Summer (DST): UTC+3 (EEST)

Dymes (Greek: Δύμες) is a village in the Limassol District of Cyprus, located 4 km south of Kyperounta.
