= Kissousa =

Kissousa Κισσούσα
- Village
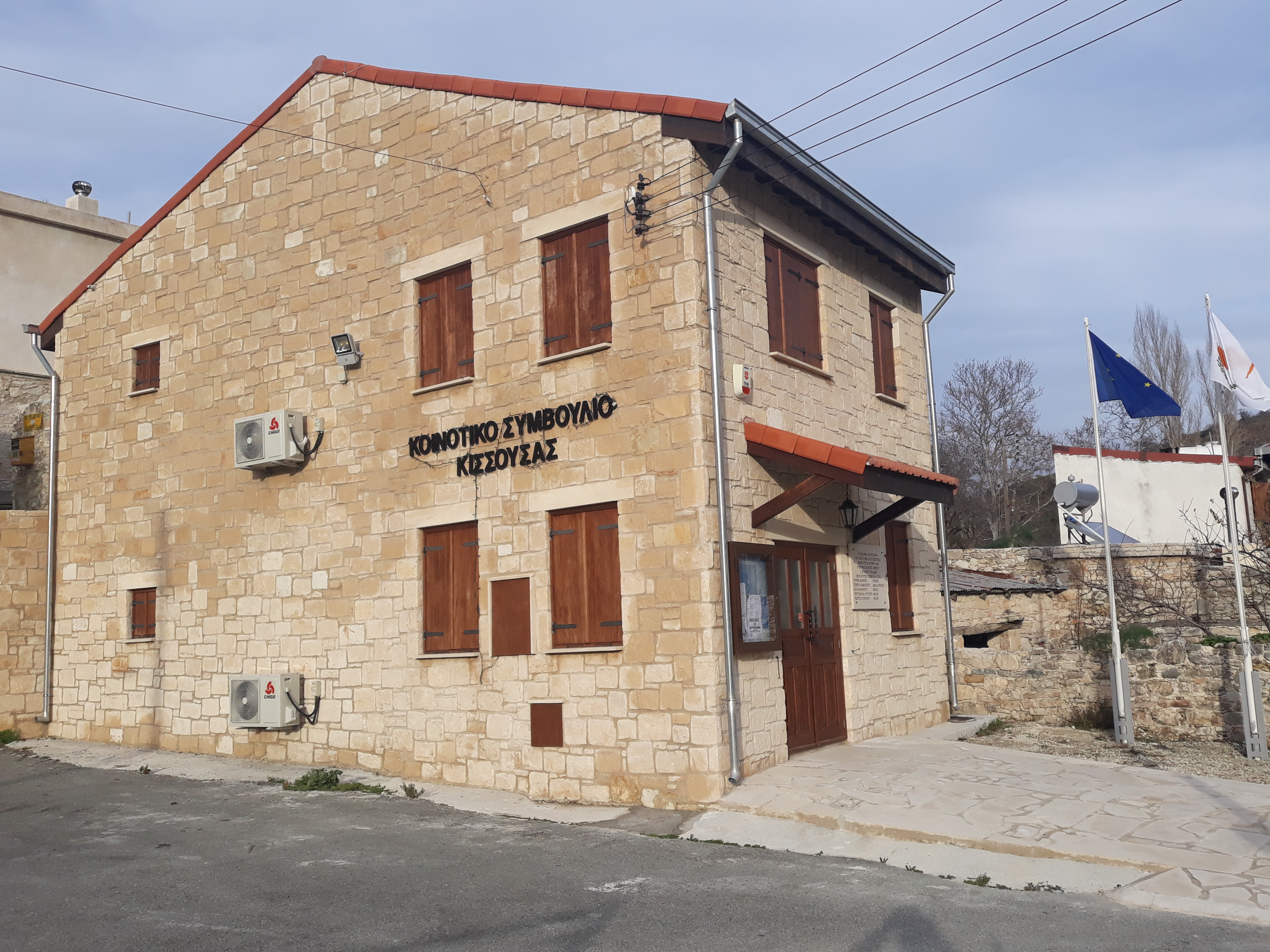

- Location in Cyprus
- Coordinates: 34°48′39″N 32°47′41″E
- Country: Cyprus
- District: Limassol District

Population (2001)
  - Total: 4
- Time zone: UTC+2 (EET)
  - Summer (DST): UTC+3 (EEST)

Kissousa (Greek: Κισσούσα) is a small village in the Limassol District of Cyprus, located 2 km south of Malia.
