= Gerovasa =

Gerovasa Γεροβάσα / Yerovası
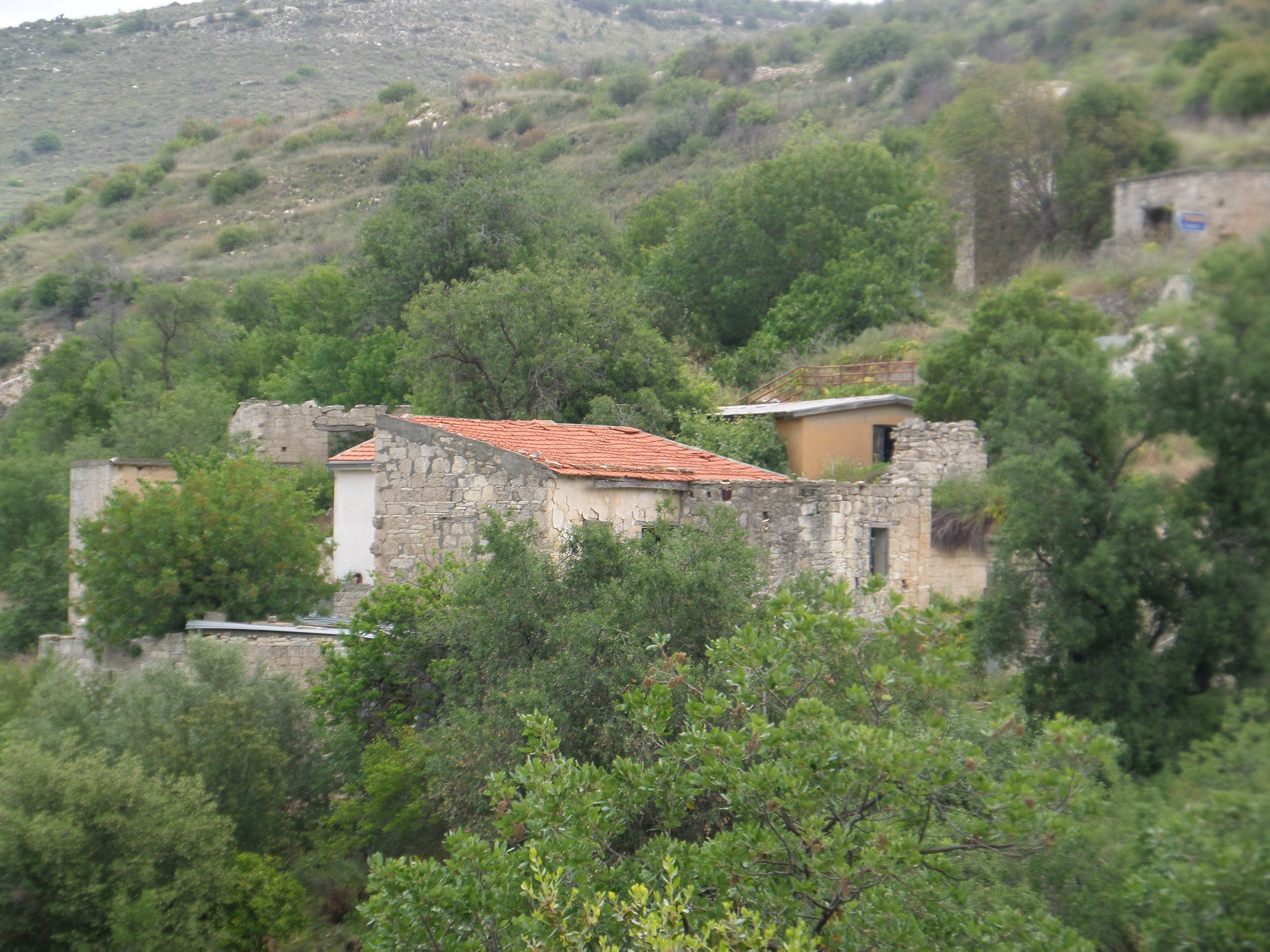

- Location in Cyprus
- Coordinates: 34°48′47″N 32°44′25″E
- Country: Cyprus
- District: Limassol District

Population (2001)
  - Total: 0
- Time zone: UTC+2 (EET)
  - Summer (DST): UTC+3 (EEST)

Gerovasa (Greek: Γεροβάσα, Turkish: Yerovası) is an abandoned village in the Limassol District of Cyprus, located 6 km west of Malia. In 1960 the majority of the inhabitants were Turkish Cypriots.
