= Agios Nikolaos (Kato Polemidia) =

Quarter of Kato Polemidia Municipality

Coordinates: 34°41′53″N 32°58′45″E

Agios Nikolaos is a district of the municipality of Kato Polemidia in the Limassol District of Cyprus.

== Location ==
To the east and north it borders with Panagia Evangelistria, to the west with Ypsonas and to the south with Anthoupolis.

== Religious sites ==
The sanctuary church of the district is dedicated to Agios Nikolaos.
