= Silikou =

Silikou: Σιλίκου (Greek); Siliku (Turkish)
- Village
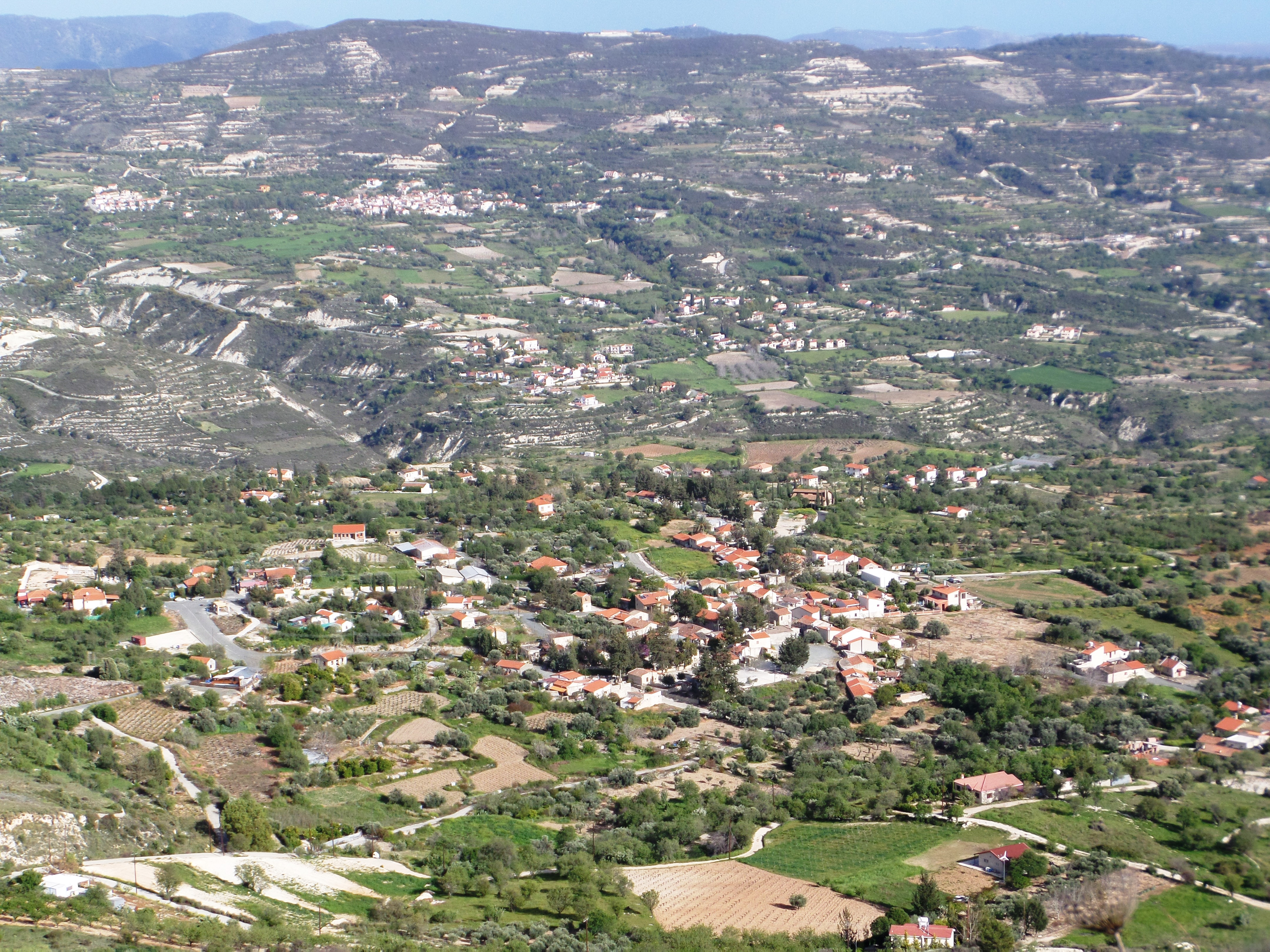

- Location in Cyprus
- Coordinates: 34°49′56″N 32°53′20″E
- Country: Cyprus
- District: Limassol District

Population (2001)
  - Total: 98
- Time zone: UTC+2 (EET)
  - Summer (DST): UTC+3 (EEST)

Silikou (Greek: Σιλίκου, Turkish: Siliku or Silifke) is a village in the Limassol District of Cyprus, located 5 km south of Pera Pedi.

Silikou village lies in the Kouris valley, situated in the Limassol District of Cyprus. The village is situated close to Trimiklini, Saitas, Dhoros, Monagri, Kouka and Lania villages.

There are two legends as to how the village acquired its name. The first is from the early settlers who founded the village during the Frankish period of 1200 AD. They came from an area in Syria called Silica. The second is from the Greek word vasilikou, which means "regal" or "royal", a reference to a section of the royal family of Cyprus that sought refuge in the village from the Ottomans.

Silikou was a mixed village consisting of Greek Cypriots and Turkish Cypriot residents. The village is now inhabited by mainly Greek Cypriots and has a population of around 100 permanent residents. Most are elderly as the younger residents have left and now work in the larger nearby towns and cities. Currently we know of two families with younger children being around the ages of 16-23, but overall it is people who were born in the village and never left.

The village has a long tradition of wine making, which began during the Frankish period, coinciding with the arrival of the settlers from Syria in 1200AD. the wine is called commandaria and a winery museum was built in Cypruses president Nikos Anastasiadis old home. The location of the village, which is built at a height of 650 metres above sea level, and the ample supply of water, helped the village prosper. It became a centre for the production of wine, Zivania and the famous Cypriot Commandaria wine, which is similar to a strong port.

A cluster of old oil trees dating back to 1300 AD verifies the long history of the village. These perennial olive trees are located between the cypriot and the Turkish neighborhoods of Silikou, only a few metres away from the Commandaria Museum and the ruins of the old mosque. Olive trees are a very large source of oil in silikou the residents spends months gathering the olives and then take them to the mill producing ample amounts of fresh and pure olive oil straight from nature.
