= Agios Amvrosios, Limassol =

Agios Amvrosios Άγιος Αμβρόσιος
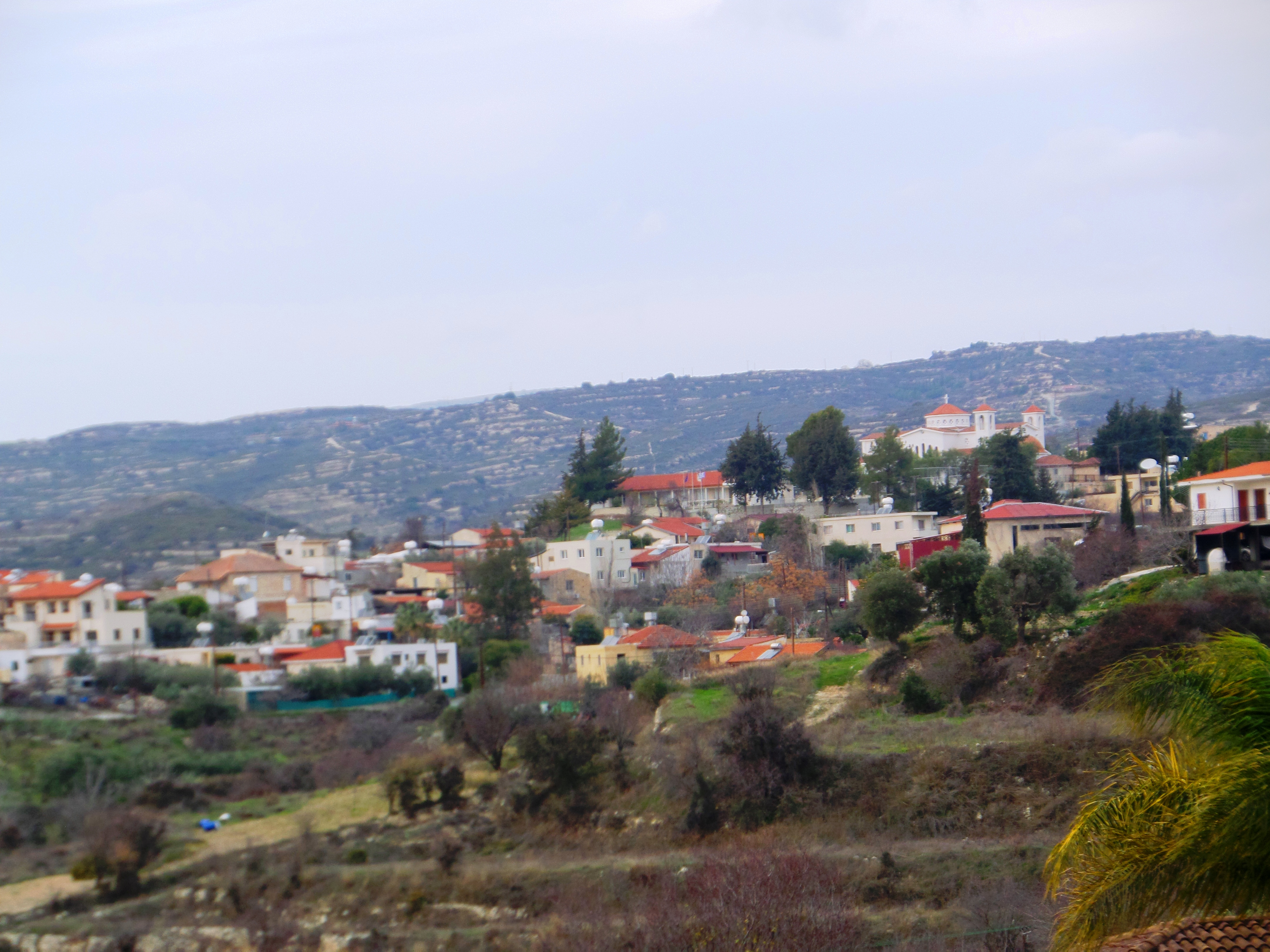

- Location in Cyprus
- Coordinates: 34°46′52″N 32°49′34″E
- Country: Cyprus
- District: Limassol District

Population (2001)
  - Total: 291
- Time zone: UTC+2 (EET)
  - Summer (DST): UTC+3 (EEST)

Agios Amvrosios (Greek: Άγιος Αμβρόσιος) is a small village located in the Limassol District of Cyprus, northwest of the city of Limassol, near the village of Pachna.

== Natural Environment ==
A noteworthy geomorphological phenomenon in the area of Agios Ambrosios is the capture of the waters of the Paramali River by the Kryos River, a tributary of the Kouris River. Although the Kryos descends from the Troodos range and follows an almost straight southwestward course, appearing to be a continuation of the Paramali River, it makes a 90-degree turn eastward just north of Agios Ambrosios, where it joins the Kouris. Between this bend and the upper course of the Paramali River lie all the geomorphological indicators demonstrating that river capture indeed occurred in this locality. It is one of the very few classic examples of river capture documented in Cyprus.

== Viticulture ==
Agios Ambrosios is one of the renowned wine villages of the Limassol District. It is known for its abundant vineyards and for the wines produced by the village's ecological winery.

== Βιβλιογραφία ==
- Καρούζης, Γιώργος (2001). Περιδιαβάζοντας την Κύπρο: Λεμεσός (πόλη και επαρχία) (πρώτη ed.). Λευκωσία: ΣΕΛΑΣ Κεντρο Μελετων Ερευνων & Εκδοσεων. p. 206-207. ISBN 9963-566-67-7.
