= Governor's Beach, Limassol =

Beach in Cyprus

Governor's Beach
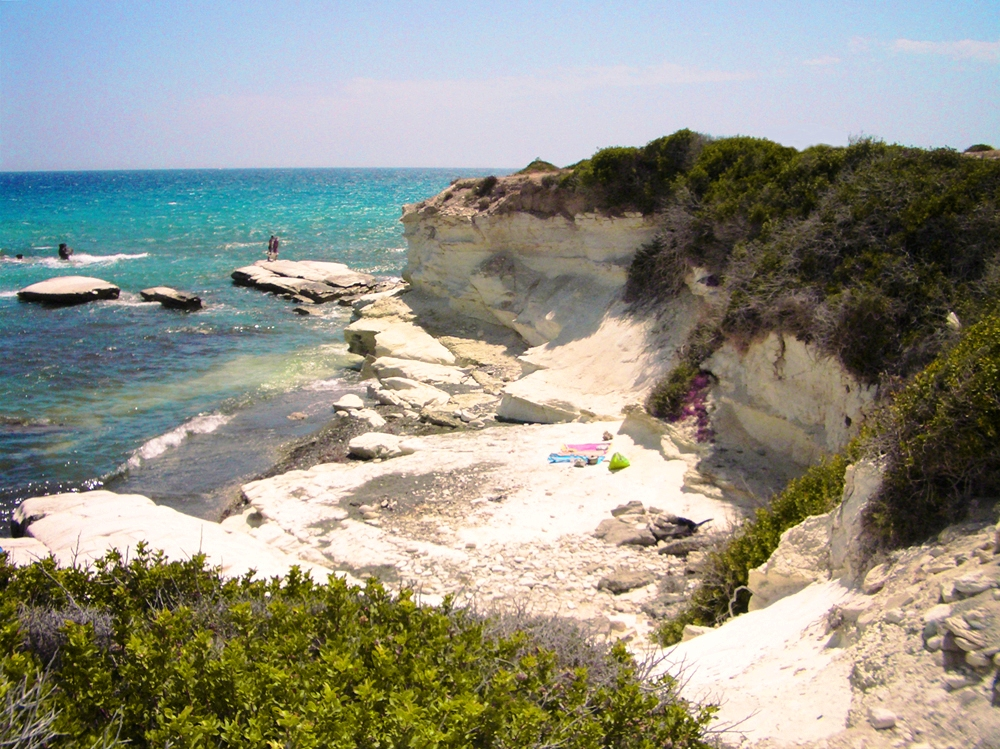
- One of the many coves of the beach

- Location within Cyprus
- Coordinates: 34°42′55″N 33°16′24.5″E
- Ocean/sea sources: Mediterranean Sea
- Basin countries: Cyprus

The Governor's Beach (Greek: Ακτή του Κυβερνήτη) is located partly in the Larnaca and in the Limassol region. It is a 2 km shoreline, with sandy beaches, deep crystal waters and a blue flag waving. The area is unknown to most locals and tourists. Because of the structure of the shoreline, consisting of well-hidden small coves, it is one of the few semi-official nudist beach spots in Cyprus.

== Name Origin ==
The name Governor's Beach derives from a former British governor.

== Location ==
The beach is about 40 km west of Larnaca and 30 km east of Limassol and well beyond the city tourist strip, but it is still popular enough to get a daily bus service. The beach lies down some steps well off the main Nicosia/Limasol highway at the bottom of white cliffs, which are in sharp contrast to the dark sand below that gets very hot in high summer. These cliffs, famously known as the "White Rocks," are made of striking white chalk and limestone.
