= Agios Georgios, Limassol =

Agios Georgios Άγιος Γεώργιος
- Village
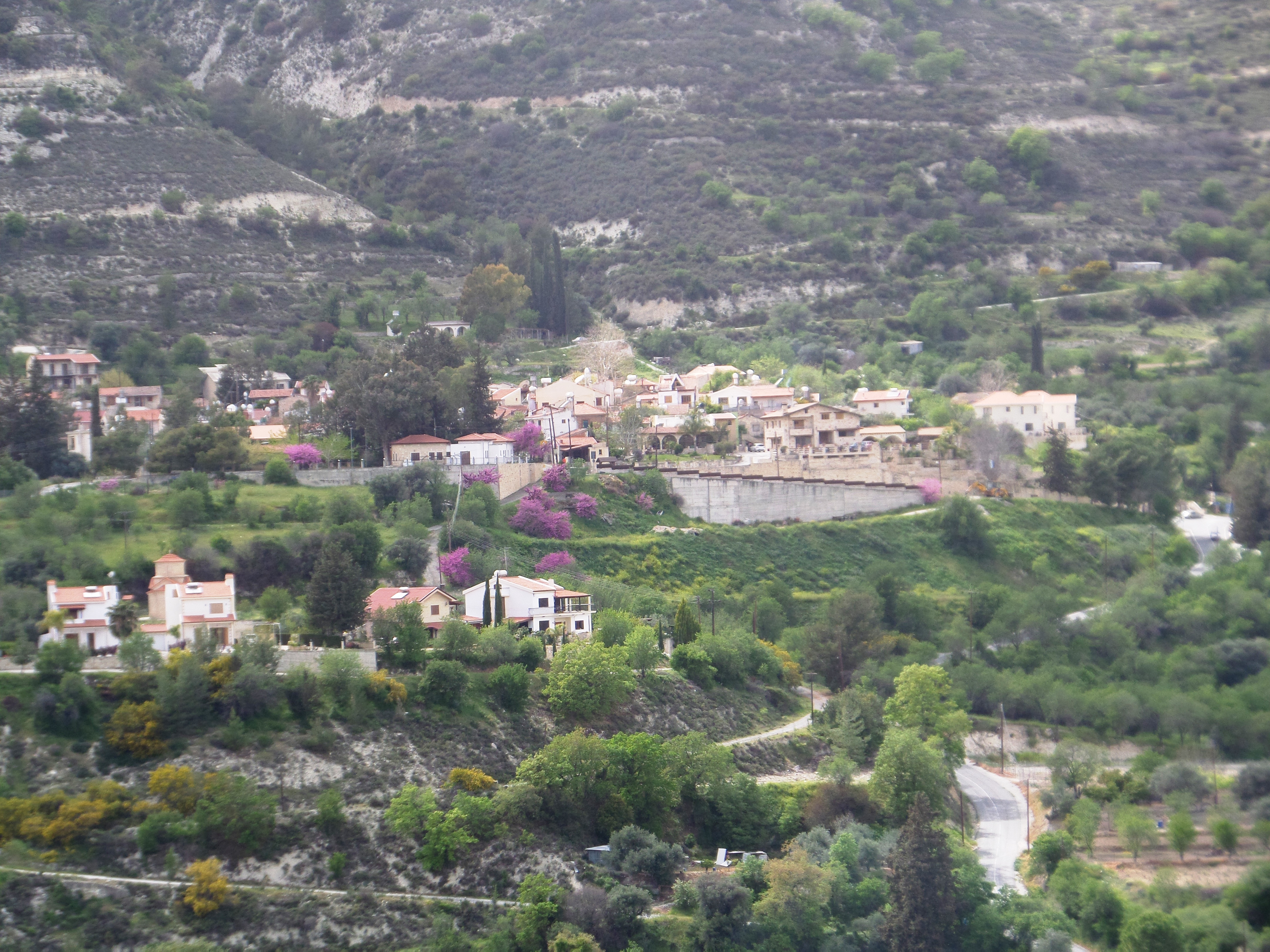

- Location in Cyprus
- Coordinates: 34°48′54″N 32°53′55″E
- Country: Cyprus
- District: Limassol District

Population (2001)
  - Total: 69
- Time zone: UTC+2 (EET)
  - Summer (DST): UTC+3 (EEST)

Agios Georgios (Greek: Άγιος Γεώργιος) is a village located in the Limassol District of Cyprus, approximately 20 km north of Limassol.
