= Doros, Cyprus =

Doros Δωρός
- Village
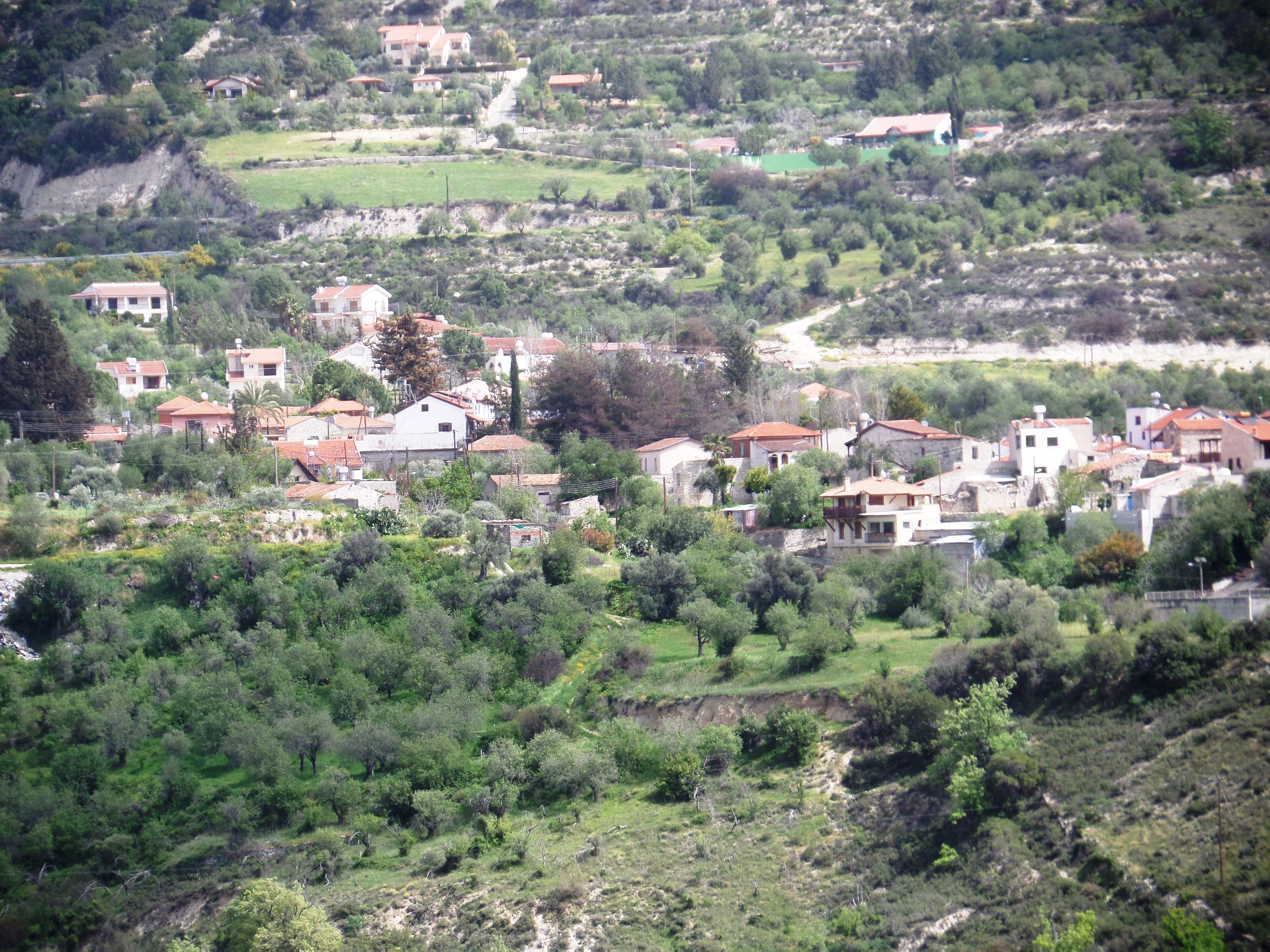

- Location in Cyprus
- Coordinates: 34°48′57″N 32°54′42″E
- Country: Cyprus
- District: Limassol District

Population (2001)
  - Total: 101
- Time zone: UTC+2 (EET)
  - Summer (DST): UTC+3 (EEST)

Doros (Greek: Δωρός) is a village in the Limassol District of Cyprus, located 1 km north of Monagri.

Doros in Greek or Thoros in English is the name of the village, which is situated on a hill of 470 metres. It is hidden and surrounded by almond trees and grape vines. Doros is 25 km outside Limassol on the left side of the main road if you are travelling towards Troodos.

The name Doros is associated with the ancient Greek word doris, which means forest. The 150 or so residents are all farmers tending their livestock and all the fruit orchards.

== History ==
At the beginning of July 2002, an ancient tomb was discovered and was handed over to the Antiques Department.

The historian Florio Bustronius states that Dóros was granted as a fief to Philip Podocataro between 1464 and 1468 CE. George Bustronius reports that it was taken from Podocataro a few years later. In Venetian maps, the village appears under the name Dore.

== Bibliography ==
- Καρούζης, Γιώργος (2001). Περιδιαβάζοντας την Κύπρο: Λεμεσός (πόλη και επαρχία) (πρώτη ed.). Λευκωσία: ΣΕΛΑΣ Κέντρο Μελετών, Ερευνών & Εκδόσεων. p. 107-109. ISBN 9963-566-67-7.
