= Agridia =

Agridia Αγρίδια
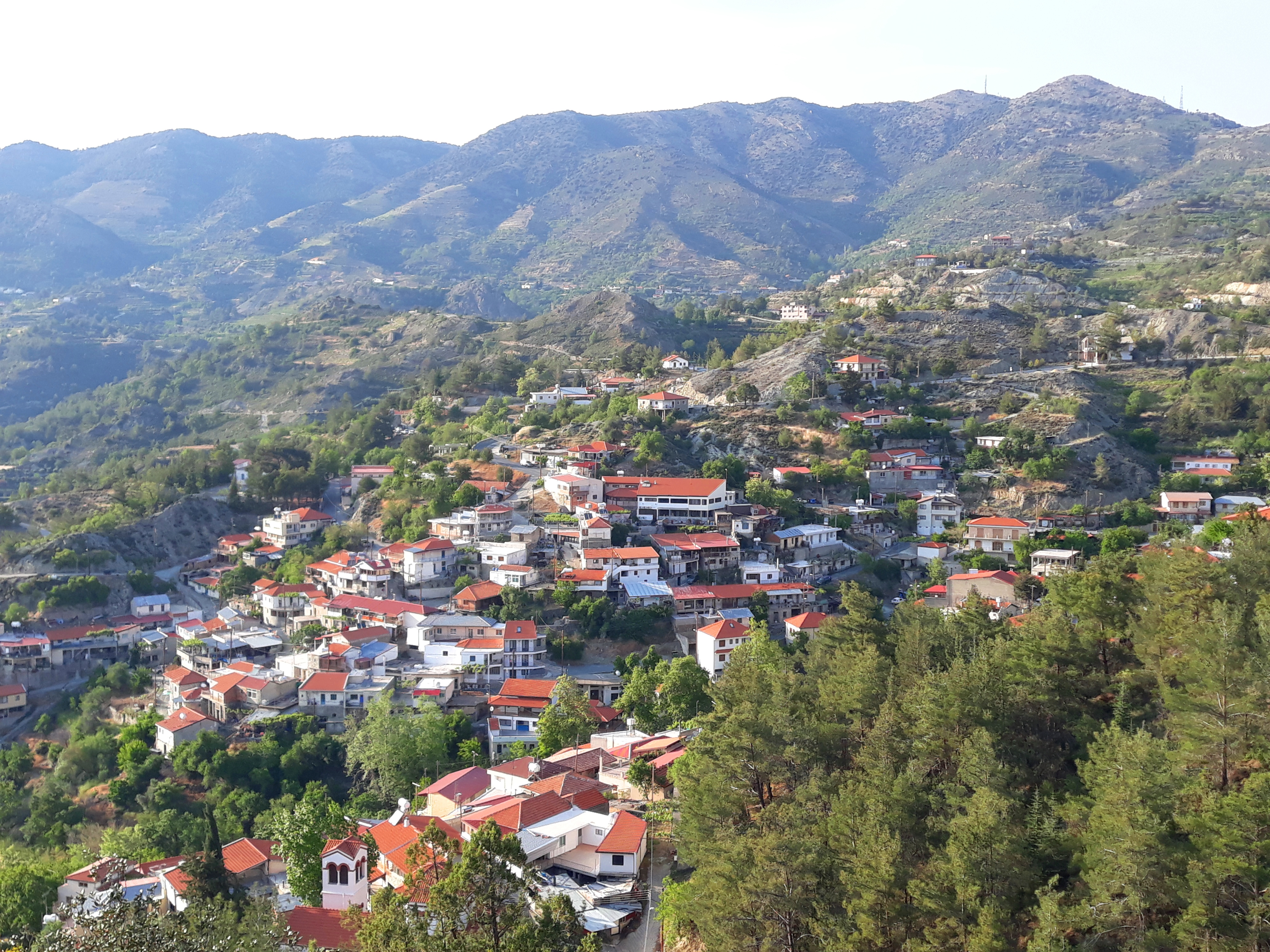

- Location within Cyprus
- Coordinates: 34°55′43″N 32°59′40″E
- Country: Cyprus
- District: Limassol District

Population (2011)
  - Total: 104
- Website: www.agridia.org

Agridia (Greek: Αγρίδια) is a village in the Limassol District of Cyprus, located 2 kilometres (1.2 mi) south of Chandria.

== History ==
Agridia is a small village of the Region of Pitsilia, in the Lemesos District. It is the ninth highest village in Cyprus, built on an altitude of 1100 m above sea level.

The village has two churches dedicated to Prophet Elias. These include a small chapel built on a hill, and a large church in the center of the village.. The village is also the place where the Troodos Observatory is located.
