= Korfi =

Korfi Κορφή
- Village
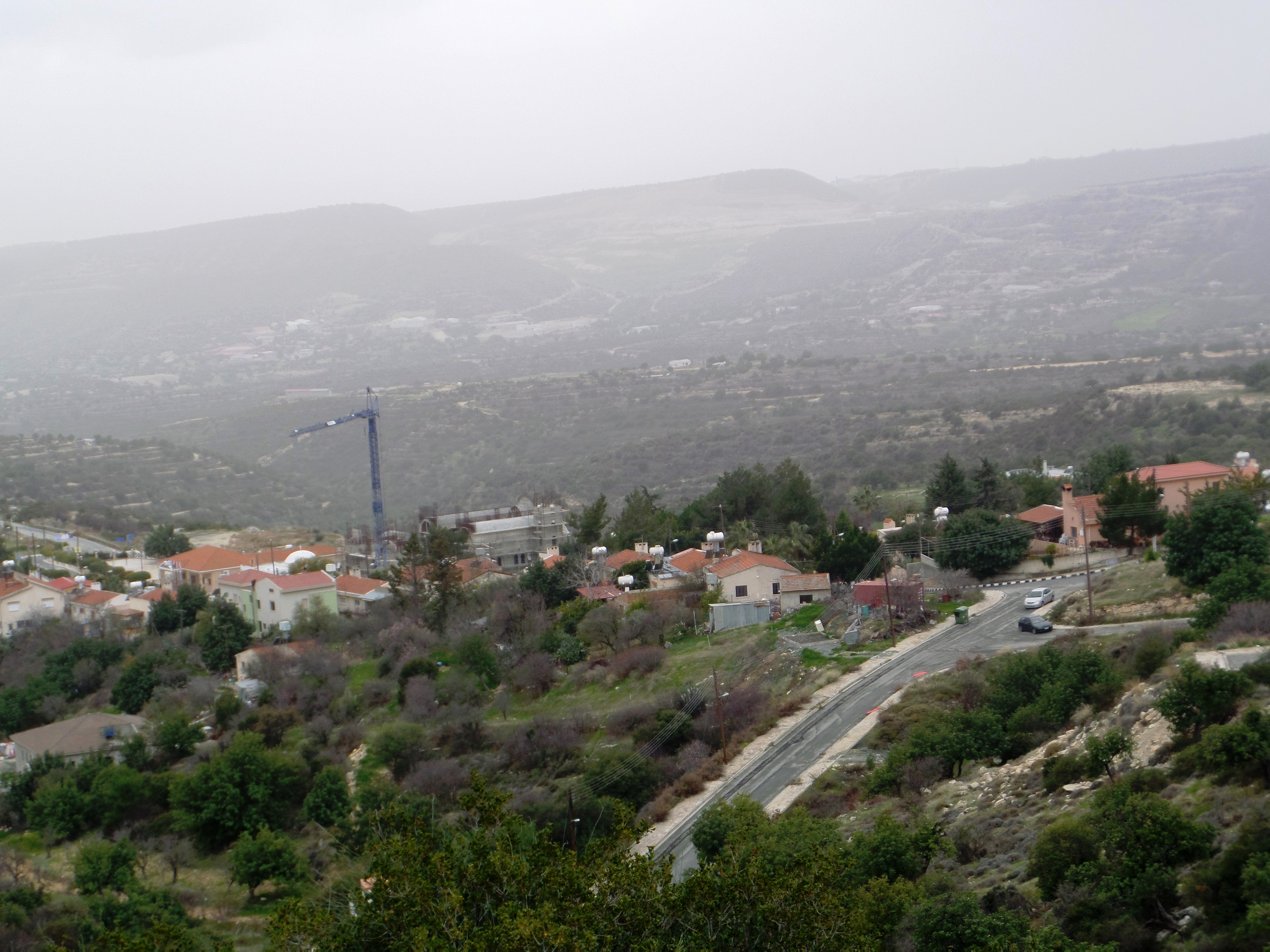

- Location in Cyprus
- Coordinates: 34°47′43″N 32°57′53″E
- Country: Cyprus
- District: Limassol District

Population (2001)
  - Total: 165
- Time zone: UTC+2 (EET)
  - Summer (DST): UTC+3 (EEST)
- Postal code: 4545
- Website: korfivillage.org

Korfi (Greek: Κορφή) or Koryfi (Κορυφή Peak) is a village in the Limassol District of Cyprus, located 4 km south of Limnatis.
