= Klonari =

Klonari Κωλάρι
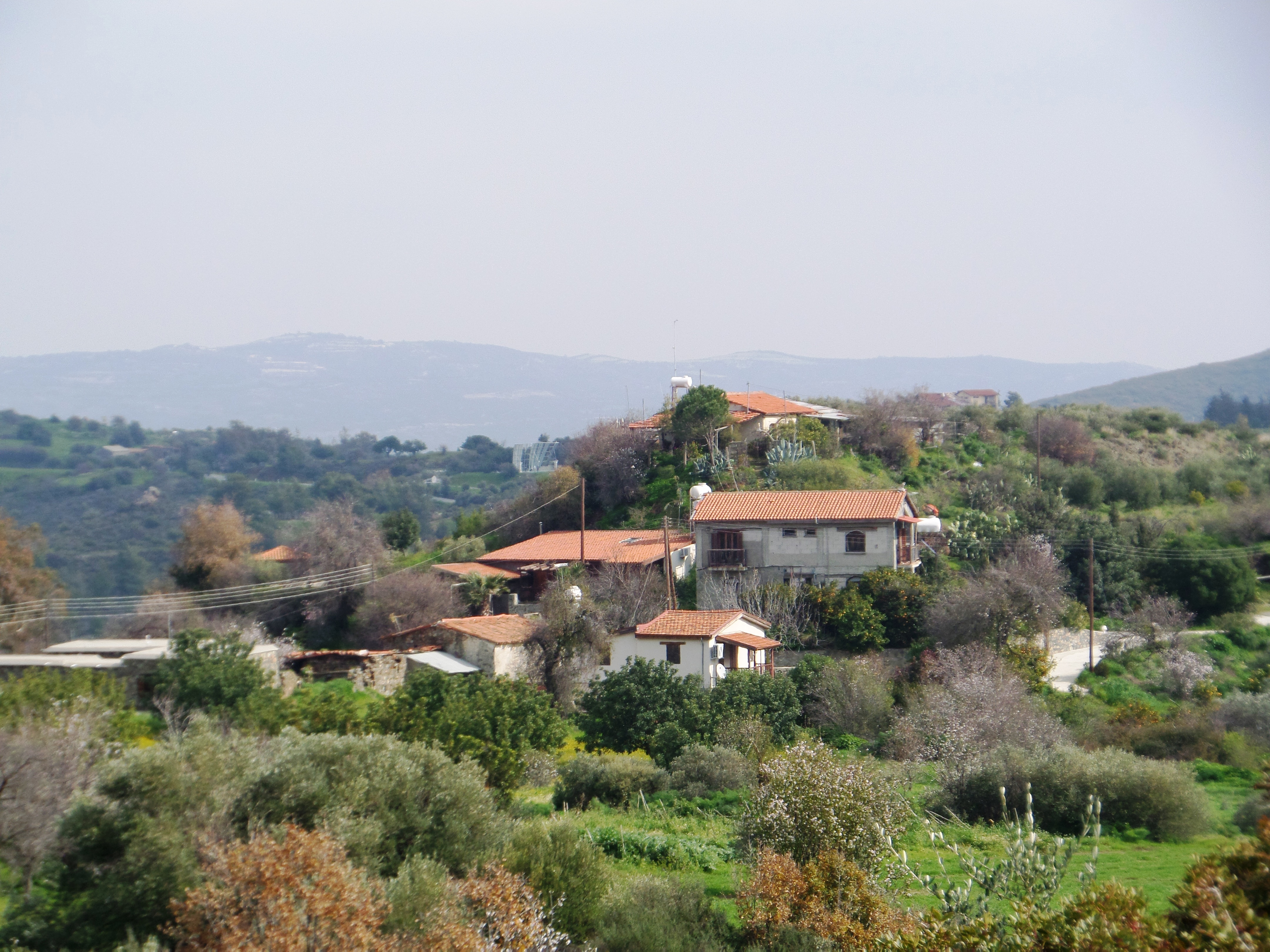

- Location in Tyrana
- Coordinates: 34°49′34″N 33°10′53″E
- Country: Cyprus
- District: Limassol District

Population (2001)
  - Total: 17
- Time zone: UTC+2 (EET)
  - Summer (DST): UTC+3 (EEST)

Klonari (Greek: Κλωνάρι) is a village in the Limassol District of Cyprus, located east of Kellaki.
