= Spitali =

Spitali Σπιτάλι
- Village
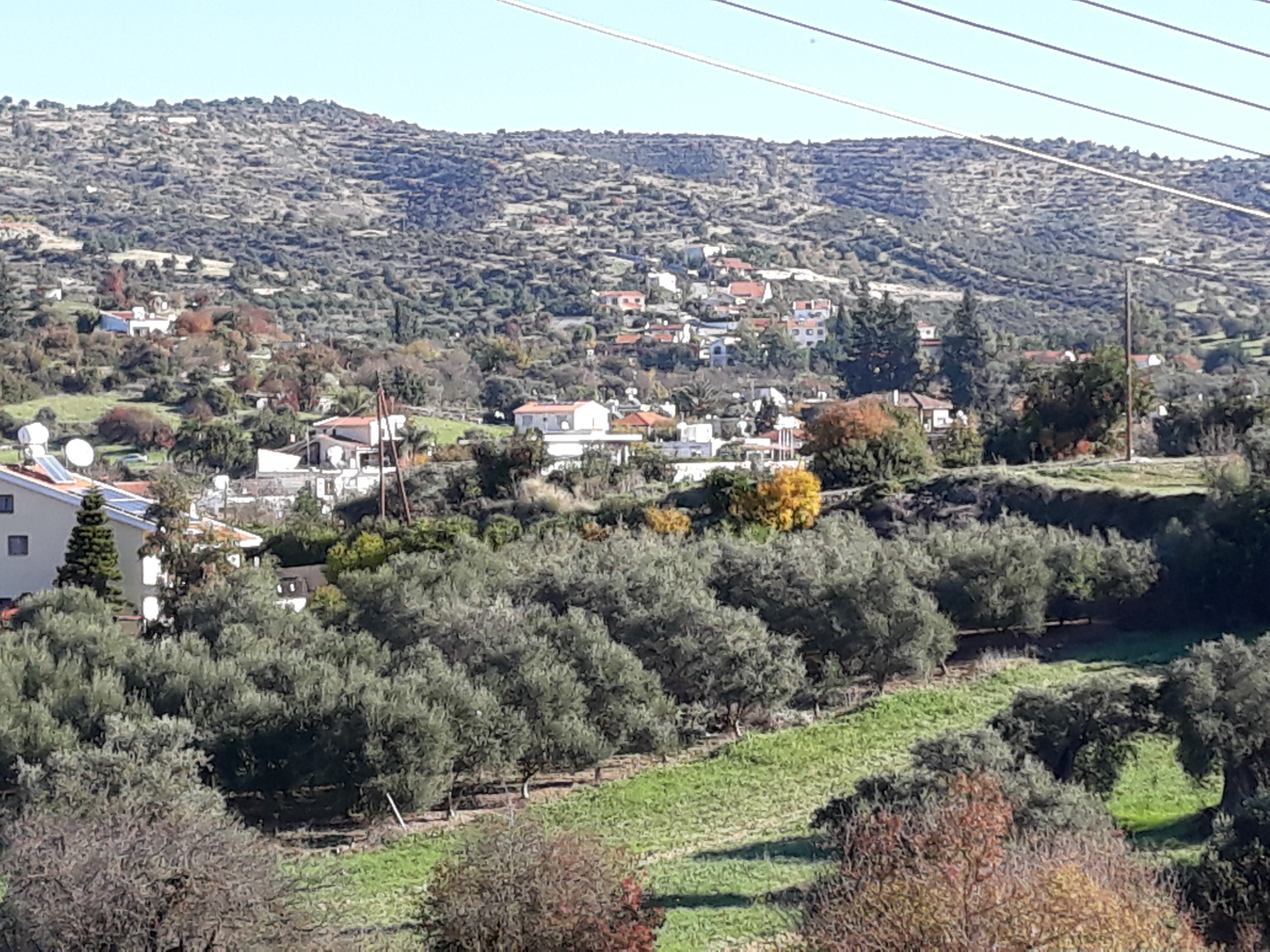
- View of Spitali

- Location in Cyprus
- Coordinates: 34°48′28″N 33°11′23″E
- Country: Cyprus
- District: Limassol District

Population (2011)
  - Total: 316
- Time zone: UTC+2 (EET)
  - Summer (DST): UTC+3 (EEST)

Spitali (Greek: Σπιτάλι) is a village in the Limassol District of Cyprus, located 1 km east of Paramytha. The altitude of the village is approximately 300 m.

== History ==
Numerous tombs from the Roman period have been discovered in Spitali, indicating it was inhabited during this period.

During the 20th century, Spitali was home to an important substation of the aerial cable railway that began in Amiantos and terminated in Limassol. The railway was used to transport asbestos from the Amiantos mines for export abroad. The station ceased operations in 1988, when the mine was closed. The remains of an aerial cableway can be seen on the northern hills; remains of a building and foundations for the cable gantries can be found. This cableway was used to transport asbestos from the open cast mine at Amiantos, Troods to a loading point in Limassol. A gantry foundation can also be found on the southern hills.

== Churches ==
There are two Greek Orthodox churches in the village, Agia Anna and Agios Nikolaos.

== Sourcing ==
- Καρούζης, Γιώργος (2001). Περιδιαβάζοντας την Κύπρο: Λεμεσός (πόλη και επαρχία) [Wandering through Cyprus: Limassol (City and District)] (πρώτη ed.). Λευκωσία: ΣΕΛΑΣ Κεντρο Μελετων Ερευνων & Εκδοσεων. p. 168-169. ISBN 9963-566-67-7.
