= Potamitissa =

Potamitissa Ποταμίτισσα
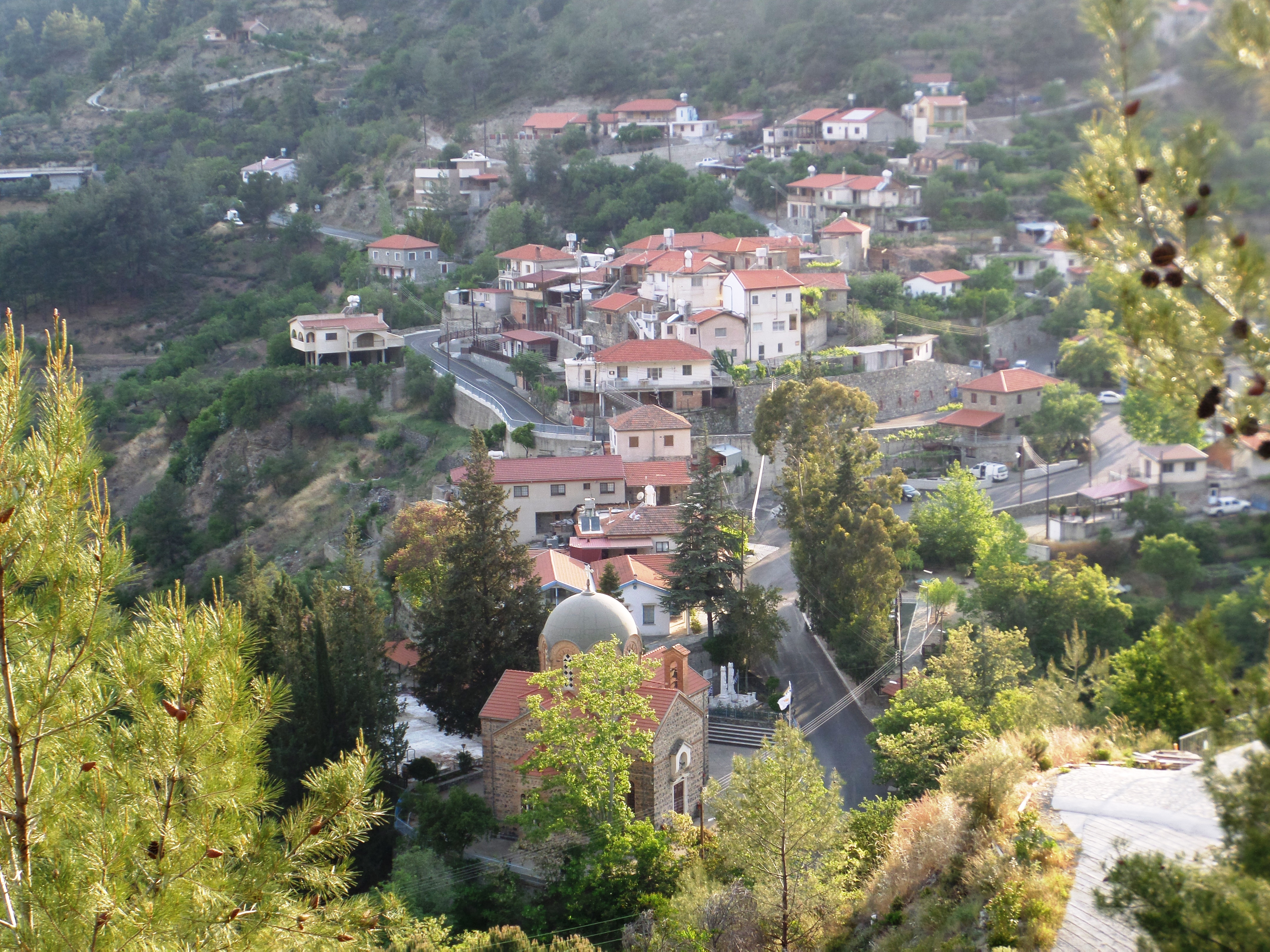

- Location in Cyprus
- Coordinates: 34°54′27″N 32°59′22″E
- Country: Cyprus
- District: Limassol District

Population (2001)
  - Total: 70
- Time zone: UTC+2 (EET)
  - Summer (DST): UTC+3 (EEST)
- Website: http://www.potamitissa.org/

Potamitissa (Greek: Ποταμίτισσα) is a village in the Limassol District of Cyprus, located 5 km south of Kyperounta.
