= Platanisteia =

Platanisteia Πλατανίστεια Çamlıca
- Village
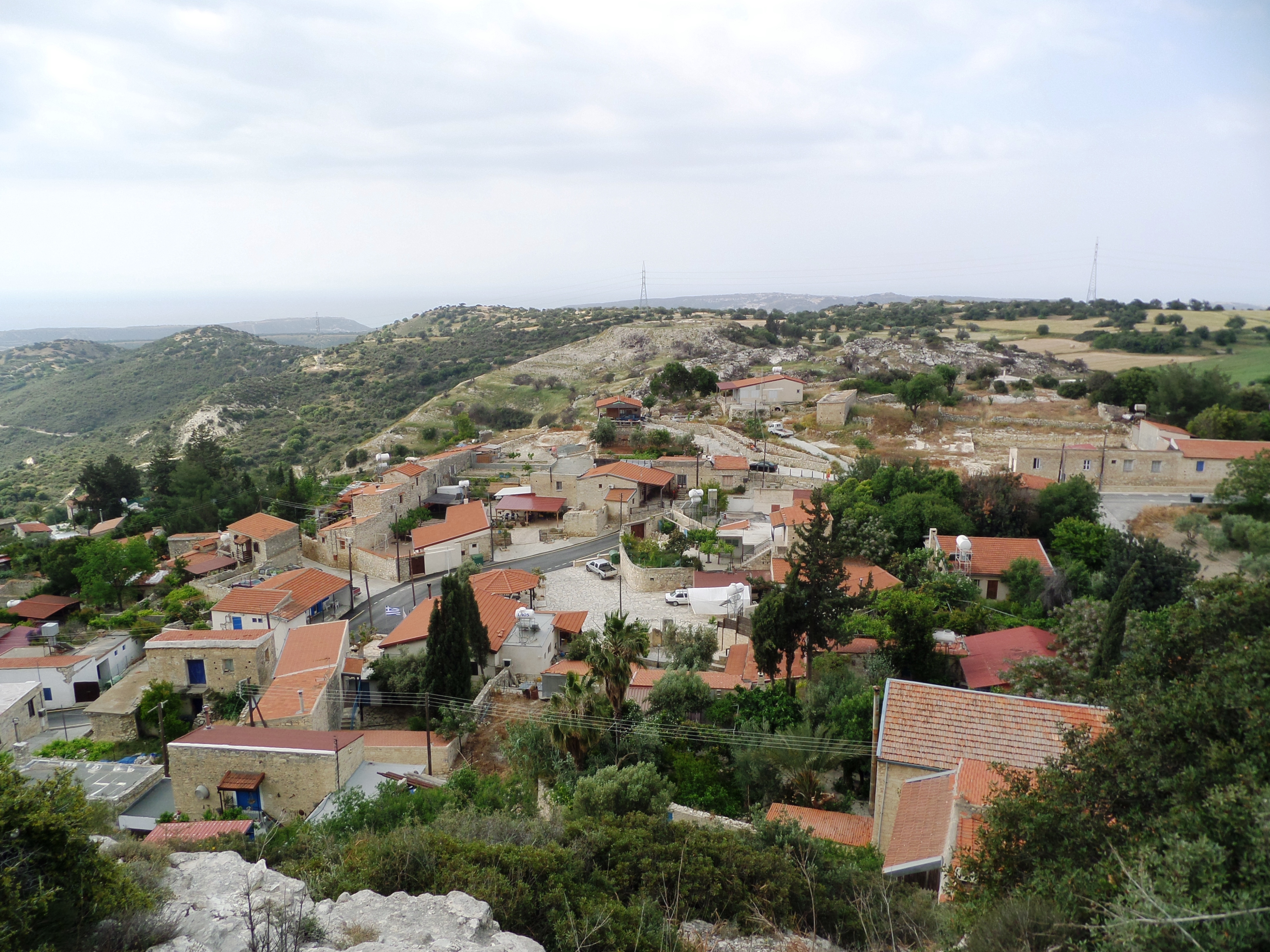

- Location in Cyprus
- Coordinates: 34°42′42″N 32°42′38″E
- Country: Cyprus
- District: Limassol District

Population (2001)
  - Total: 43
- Time zone: UTC+2 (EET)
  - Summer (DST): UTC+3 (EEST)

Platanisteia (Greek: Πλατανίστεια, Turkish: Çamlıca) is a village in the Limassol District of Cyprus, located 6 km north of Pissouri. Prior to 1960, the village was inhabited almost exclusively by Turkish Cypriots.

Its population is very small; according to the 2001 census, it had approximately 43 inhabitants.

The village has traditionally been surrounded by carob and olive trees.

The village is now the home to the Hambis Printmaking Centre, an arts centre for artist-printmakers and museum of printmakers' works, founded by the Cypriot artist Hambis Tsangaris in 2008.
