= Palaiomylos =

Palaiomylos Παλαιόμυλος, Παλιόμυλος, Παληόμυλος Paliomylos
- Village
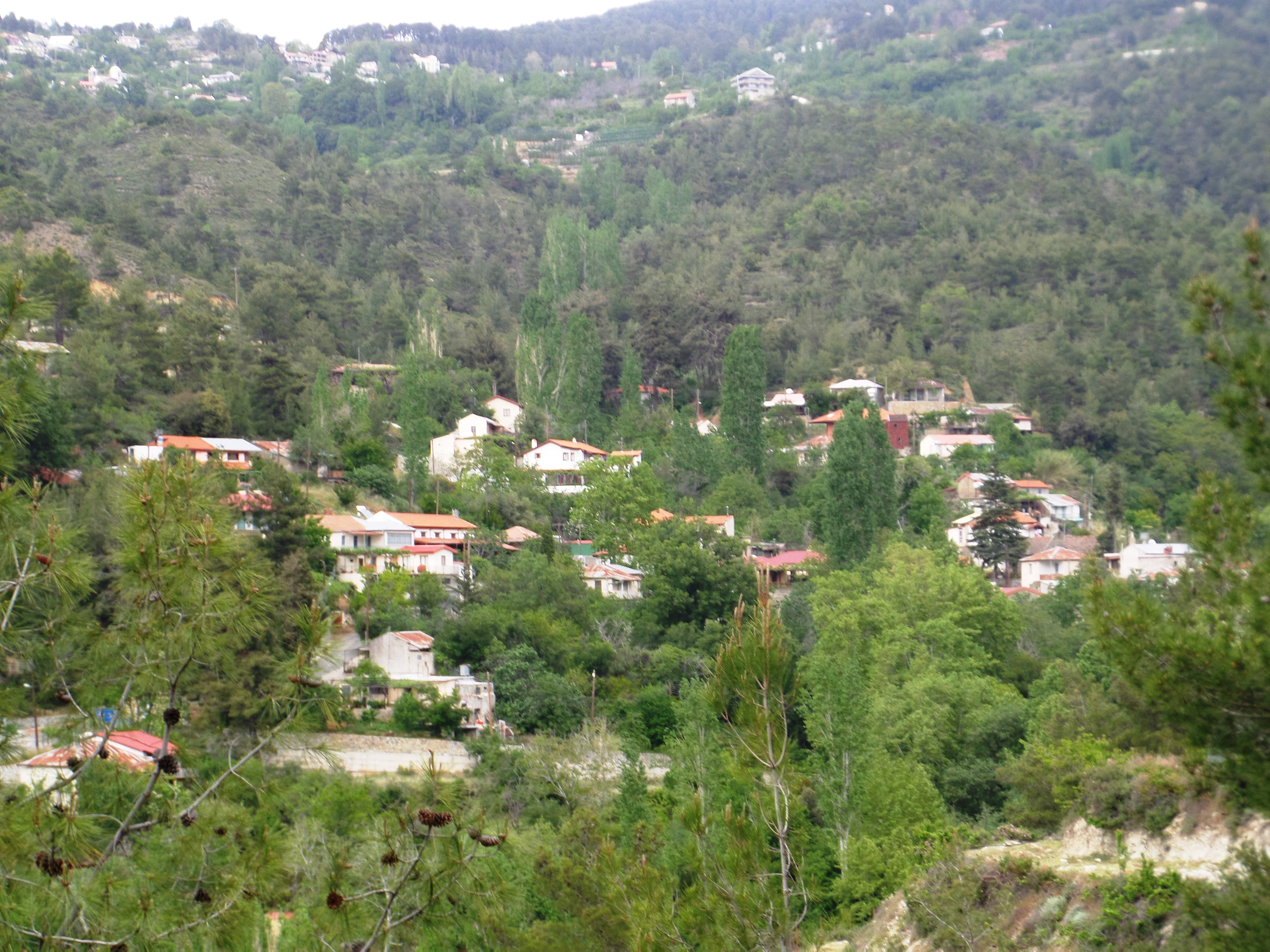

- Location in Cyprus
- Coordinates: 34°56′8″N 32°49′18″E
- Country: Cyprus
- District: Limassol District
- Elevation: 1,040 m (3,410 ft)

Population (2011)
  - Total: 20
- Time zone: UTC+2 (EET)
  - Summer (DST): UTC+3 (EEST)
- Post Code: 4845
- Website: http://www.thevillagexpress.com/cyprusvillage/profile/225

Palaiomylos (Greek: Παλαιόμυλος), also called Paliomylos (Greek: Παλιόμυλος, previously: Παληόμυλος), is a village in the Limassol District of Cyprus, located 3 km south of Prodromos.

== Demographics ==
Like many villages in the Troodos mountains, the population of Palaiomylos has declined since 1946. As of the 2010 census only 20 people permanently reside in Palaiomylos, including the primarily Vietnamese immigrants that take care of the aging population. Nevertheless, in summer the population is significantly augmented by descendants of village residents, many of whom moved to the cities as part of the urbanization Cyprus experienced in the latter half of the 20th century.

== Etymology ==
Palaiomylos was settled to take advantage of the streams running through the village by establishing water mills – Greek: μύλοι (myloi) in Greek. Palaio or palio both mean old, so the village was named after the old mills in Palaiomylos.
