= Souni–Zanatzia =

- Village
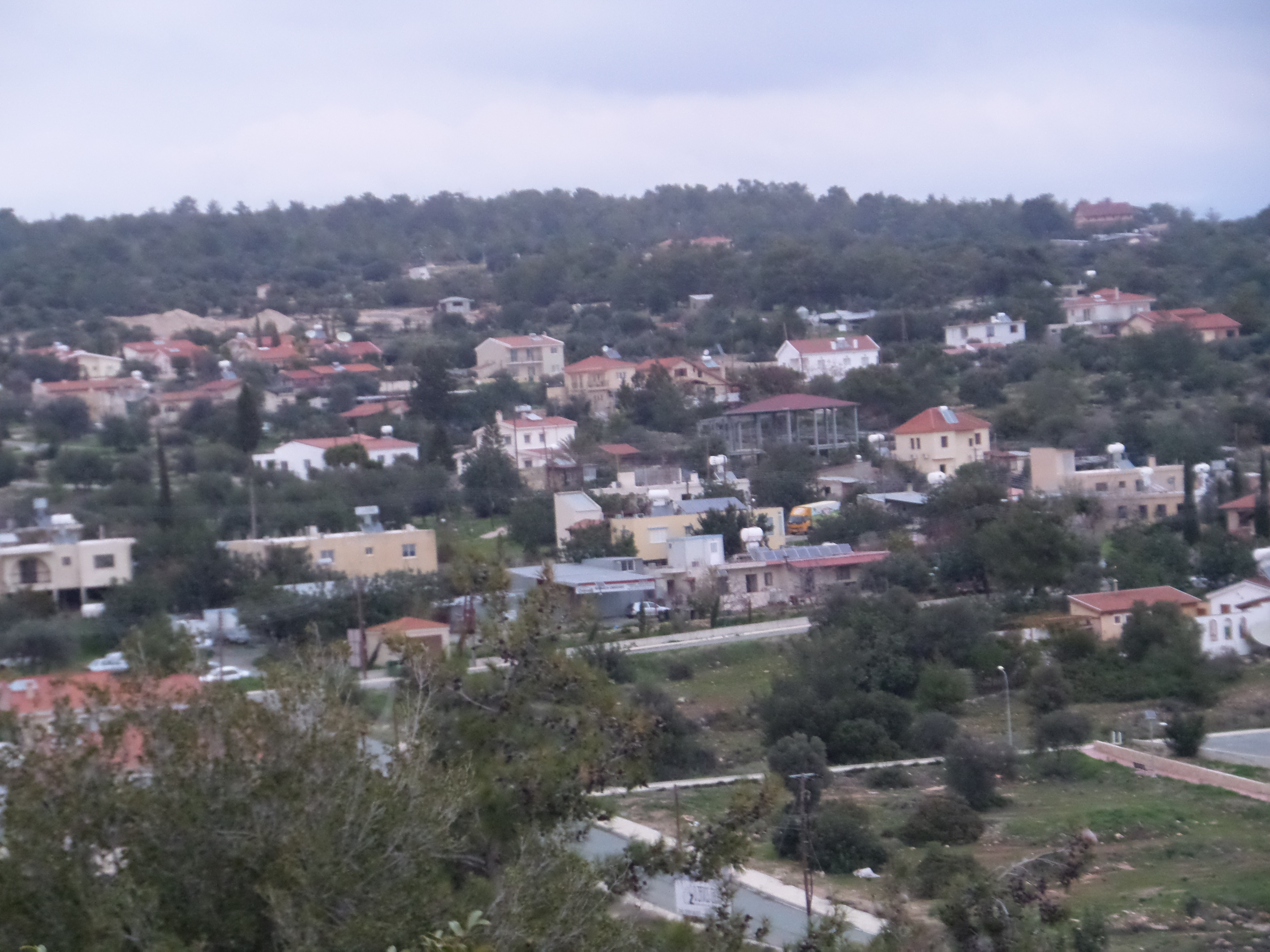

- Location in Cyprus
- Coordinates: 34°44′23″N 32°52′58″E
- Country: Cyprus
- District: Limassol District

Population (2011)
  - Total: 837
- Website: souni-zanatzia.cy

Souni–Zanatzia or Souni–Zanakia (Greek: Σούνι-Ζανατζιά or Σούνι-Ζανακιά [locally [ˈsuni zˑanaˈt͡ʃa]]) is a community consisting of two villages, Souni and Zanatzia, in the Limassol District of Cyprus. Souni is located 8 km north of Erimi.
