= Makarios (Kato Polemidia) =

Quarter of Kato Polemidia Municipality

Coordinates: 34.6867°N 33.0130°E

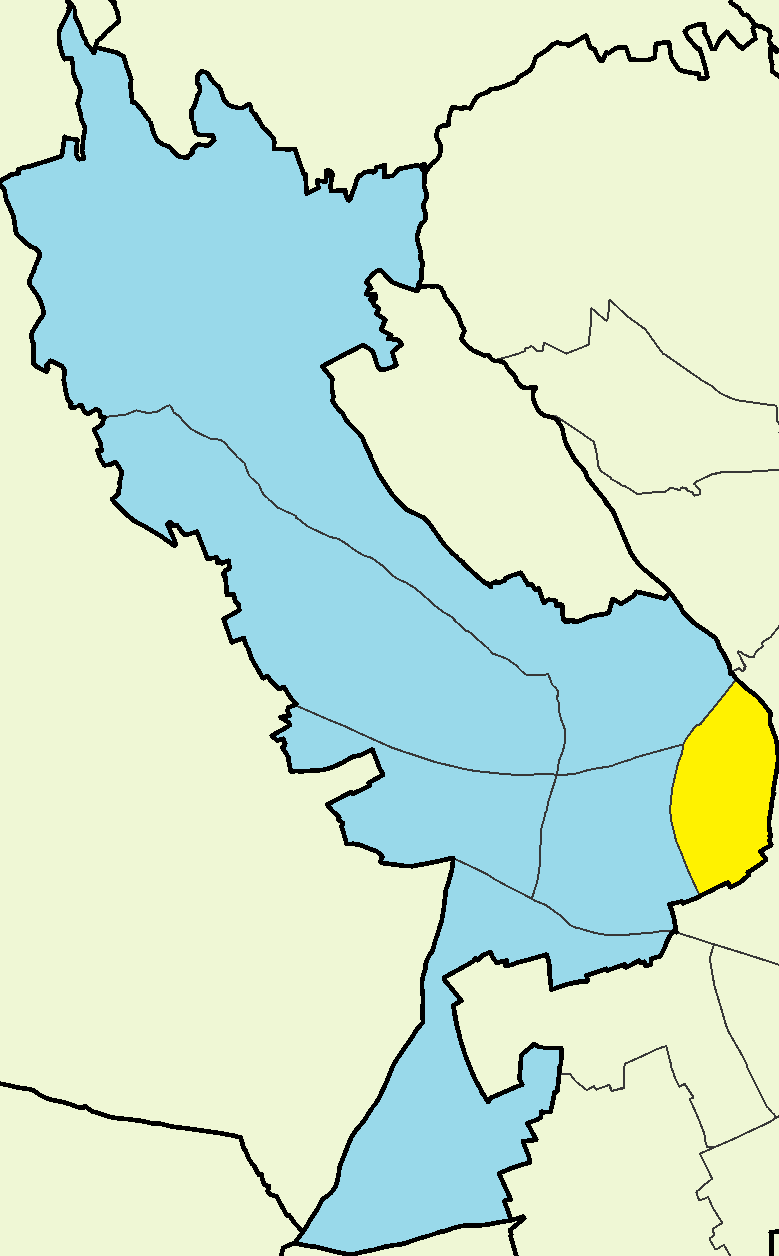
Kato Polemidia Municipality

Makarios C. is a district of the Municipality of Kato Polemidia.

== Location ==
To the south it borders with Apostolos Andreas, to the east with Agios Georgios, to the north with Panagia Evangelistria and to the west with Apostolos Barnabas.

== History ==
The district developed after the construction of the refugee settlement in which Greek Cypriot refugees settled after the Turkish invasion of 1974.

== Religious sites ==
The sacred church of the district is dedicated to Agios Neophytos. Construction began in 2005 and was completed in 2007.
