= Prastio (Kellaki) =

Prastio Πραστιό
- Village
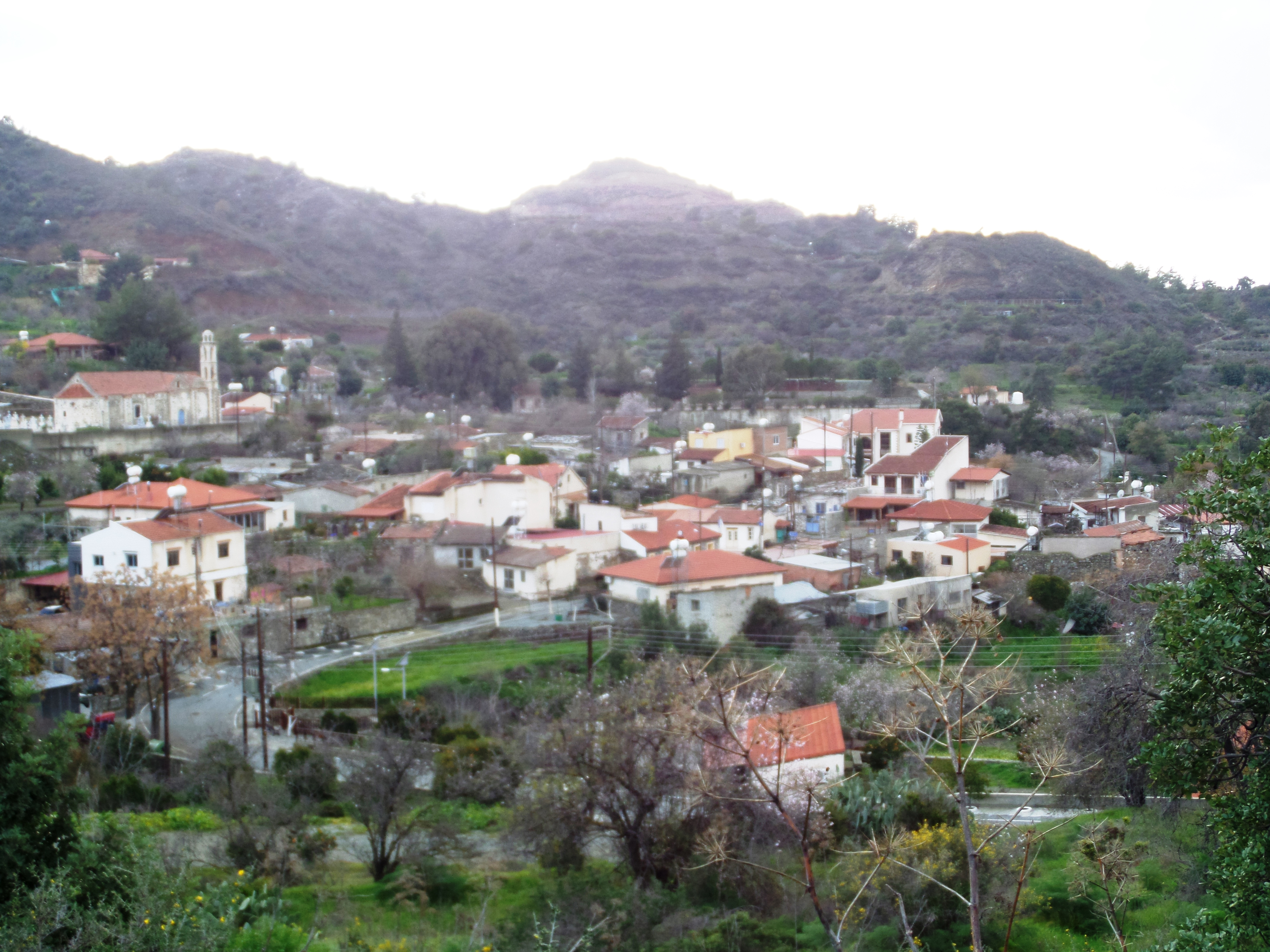

- Location in Cyprus
- Coordinates: 34°48′40″N 33°8′35″E
- Country: Cyprus
- District: Limassol District

Population (2001)
  - Total: 81
- Time zone: UTC+2 (EET)
  - Summer (DST): UTC+3 (EEST)
- Website: https://www.prastiokellakiou.org/

Prastio (Greek: Πραστιό) is a village located in the Limassol District of Cyprus, near the village of Kellaki, northeast of Limassol.
