= Limnatis, Limassol =

Limnatis Λιμνάτης
- Village
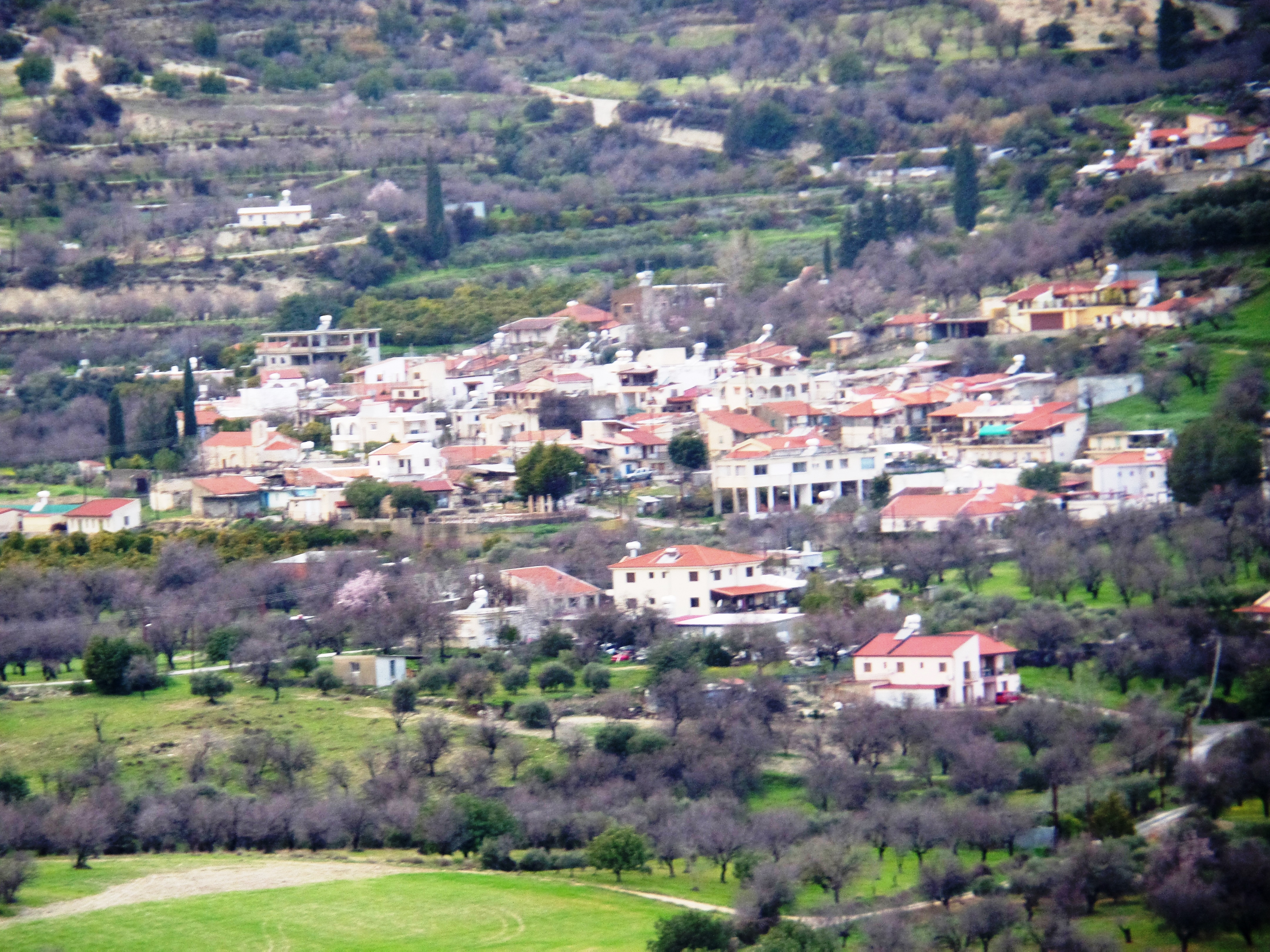

- Location in Cyprus
- Coordinates: 34°48′47″N 32°56′58″E
- Country: Cyprus
- District: Limassol District

Population (2001)
  - Total: 260
- Time zone: UTC+2 (EET)
  - Summer (DST): UTC+3 (EEST)
- Website: http://www.limnati.org/

Limnatis (Greek: Λιμνάτης, Italian: Limnati) is a village in the Limassol District of Cyprus, five kilometres south of Agios Mamas.
