= Prastio (Avdimou) =

Prastio Πραστιό
- Village
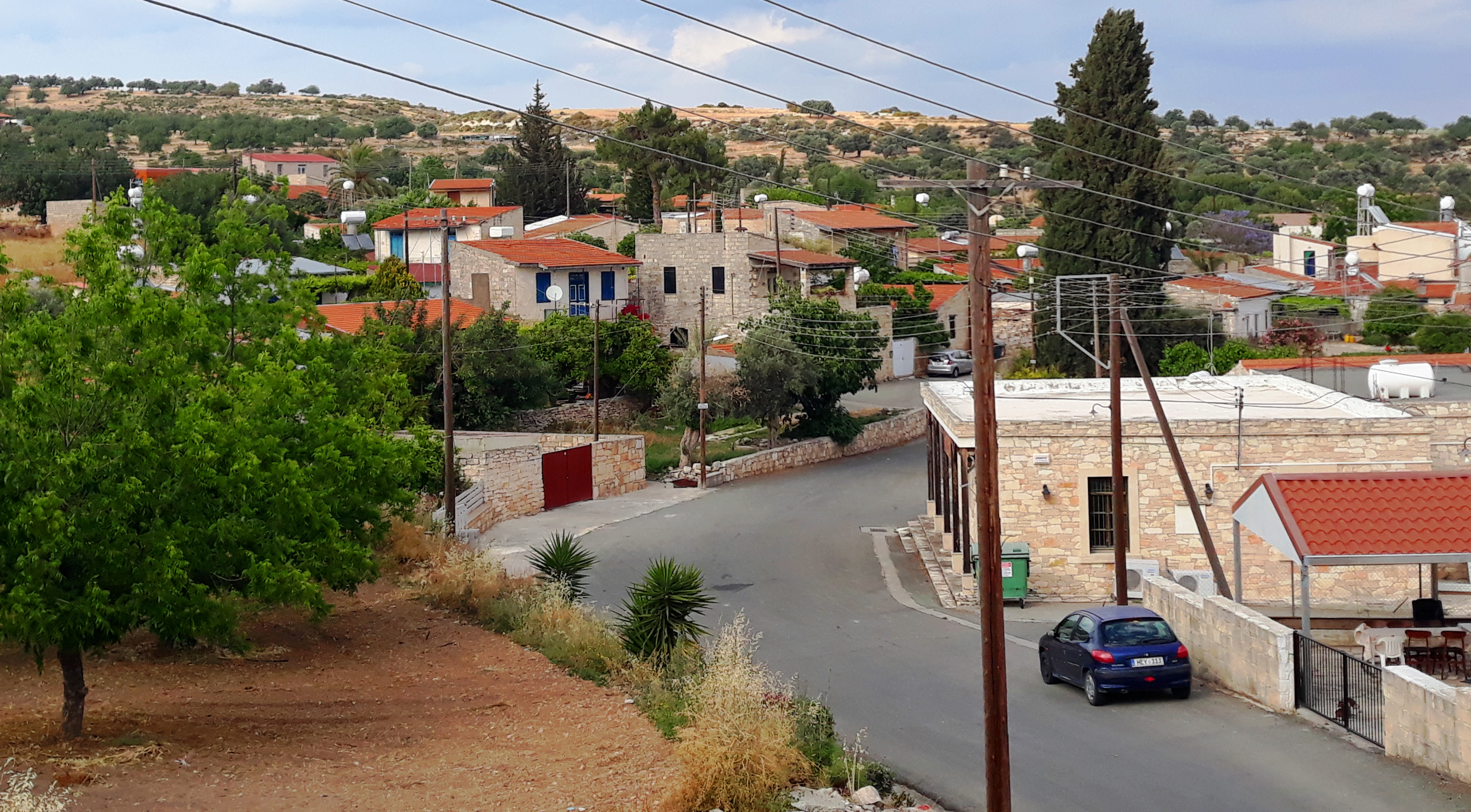

- Location in Cyprus
- Coordinates: 34°43′45″N 32°46′44″E
- Country: Cyprus
- District: Limassol District

Population (2001)
  - Total: 223
- Time zone: UTC+2 (EET)
  - Summer (DST): UTC+3 (EEST)
- Website: http://www.prastioavdimou.org.cy/

Prastio (Greek: Πραστιό or Πραστειό) is a village located in the Limassol District of Cyprus, north of the village of Avdimou.
