= Arakapas =

Arakapas Αρακαπάς
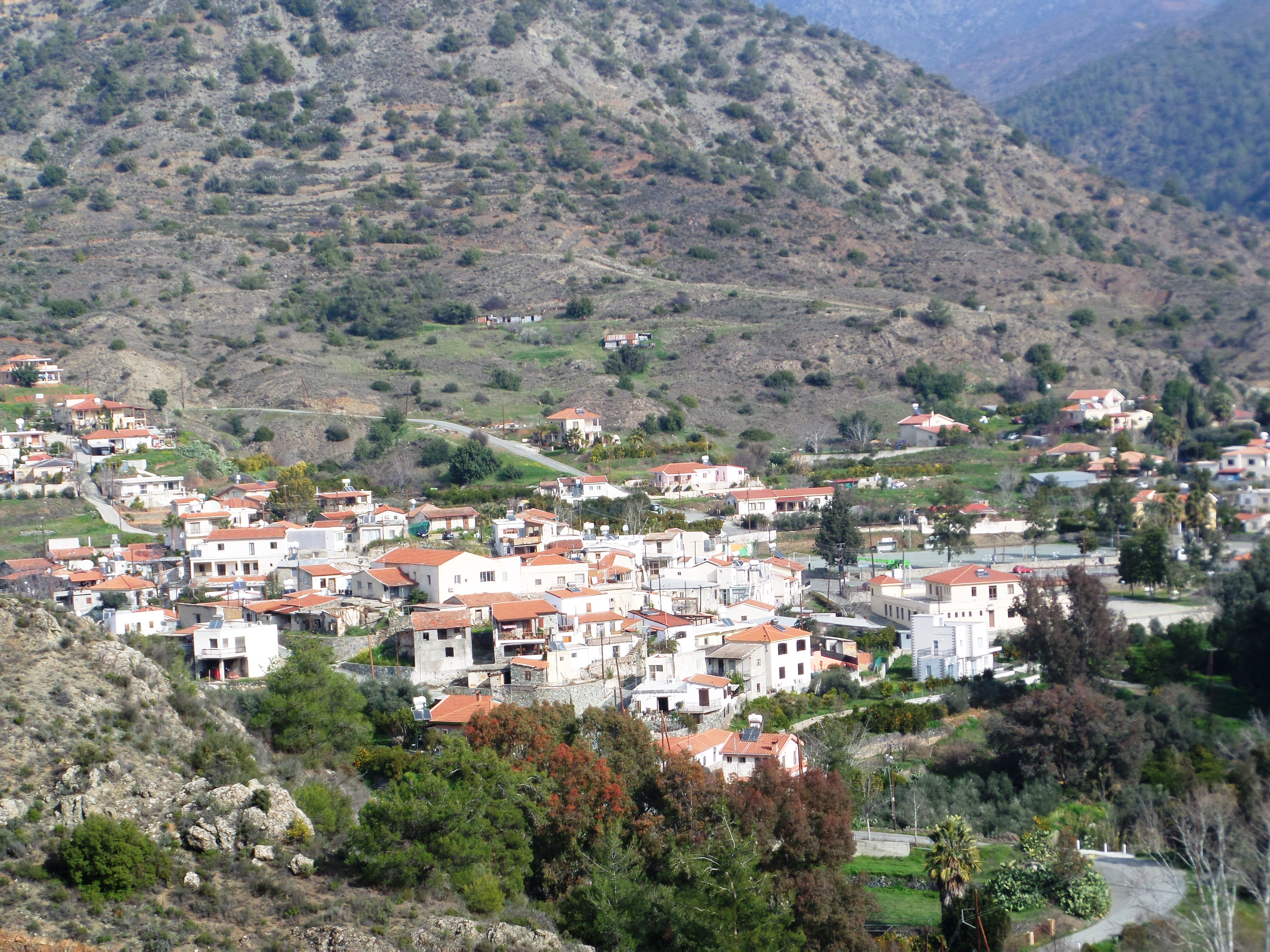

- Location in Cyprus
- Coordinates: 34°50′39″N 33°6′46″E
- Country: Cyprus
- District: Limassol District

Population (2001)
  - Total: 292
- Time zone: UTC+2 (EET)
  - Summer (DST): UTC+3 (EEST)

Arakapas (Greek: Αρακαπάς) is a village in the Limassol District of Cyprus, located 5 km west of Eptagoneia.

== Religion ==
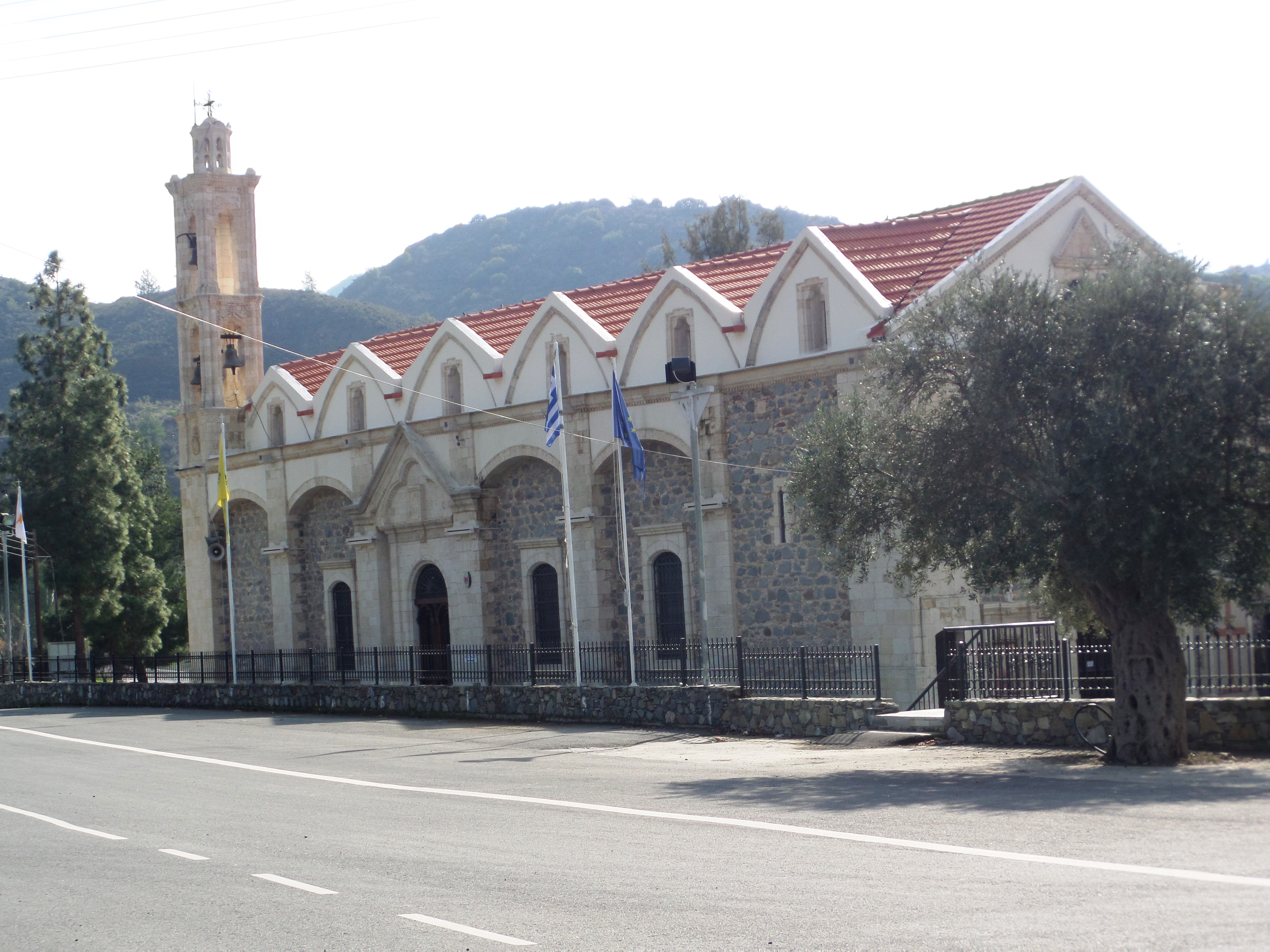
The new Panagia Iamatiki church, built 1822

In Arakapas there are two churches, the old and the new Church of Panagia Iamatiki. The old church dates to the 15th century, while the new church was built in 1822.

== Bibliography ==
- Καρούζης, Γιώργος (2001). Περιδιαβάζοντας την Κύπρο: Λεμεσός (πόλη και επαρχία) [Wandering Through Cyprus: Limassol (city and district)] (πρώτη ed.). Λευκωσία: ΣΕΛΑΣ Κεντρο Μελετων Ερευνων & Εκδοσεων. p. 148-150. ISBN 9963-566-67-7.
