= Kato Kivides =

Kato Kivides Κάτω Κυβίδες Kivides
- Village
- Location in Cyprus
- Coordinates: 34°45′51″N 32°51′41″E
- Country: Cyprus
- District: Limassol District

Population (2011)
  - Total: 5
- Time zone: UTC+2 (EET)
  - Summer (DST): UTC+3 (EEST)

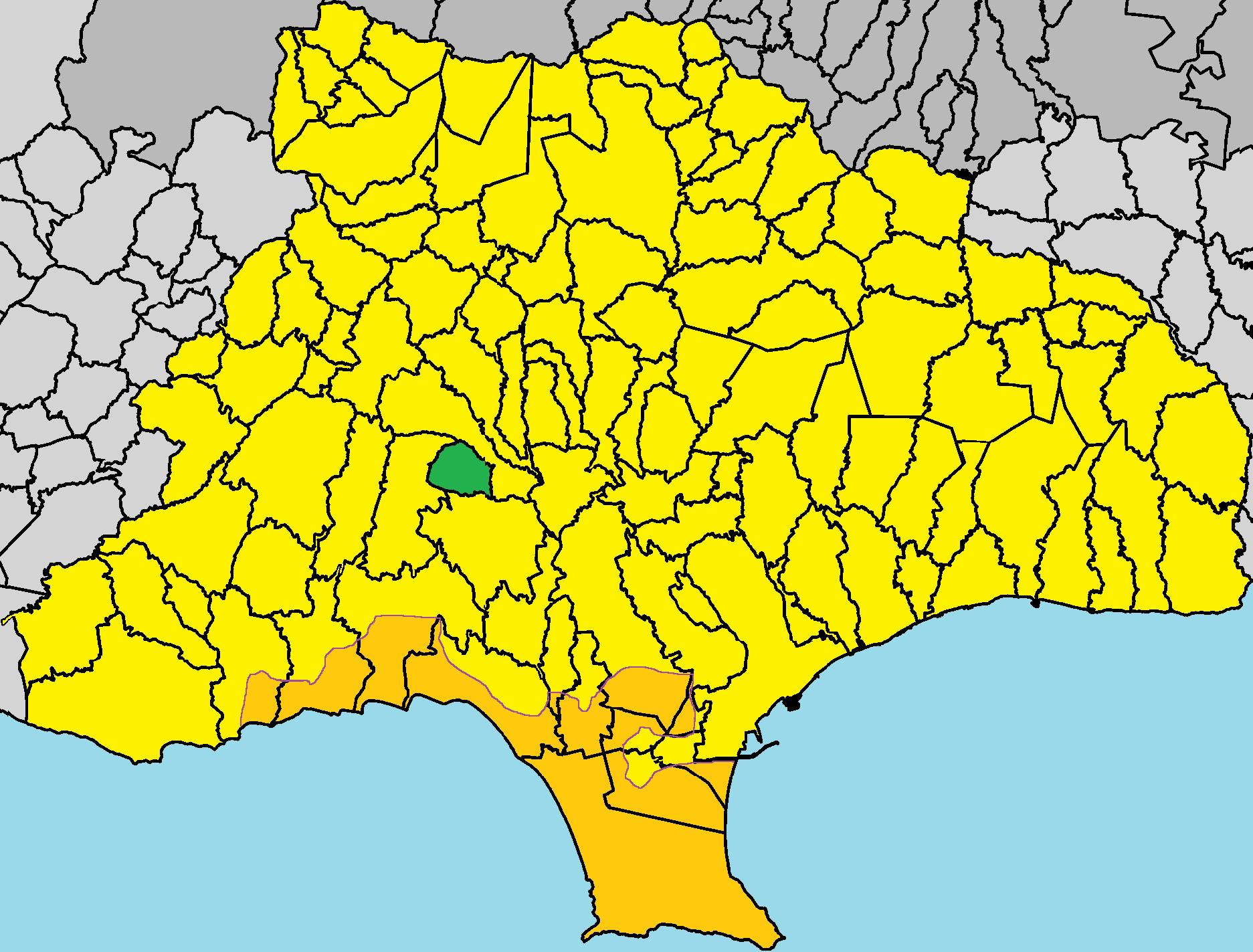

Kato Kivides (Greek: Κάτω Κυβίδες, Turkish: Aşağı Alsandık) is a village in the Limassol District of Cyprus. In 1973 all the inhabitants were Turkish Cypriots.
