= Pano Kivides =

Pano Kivides Πάνω Κυβίδες Kivides
- Village
- Location in Cyprus
- Coordinates: 34°45′23″N 32°51′28″E
- Country: Cyprus
- District: Limassol District

Population (2001)
  - Total: 696
- Time zone: UTC+2 (EET)
  - Summer (DST): UTC+3 (EEST)
- Website: http://www.panokivides.org/

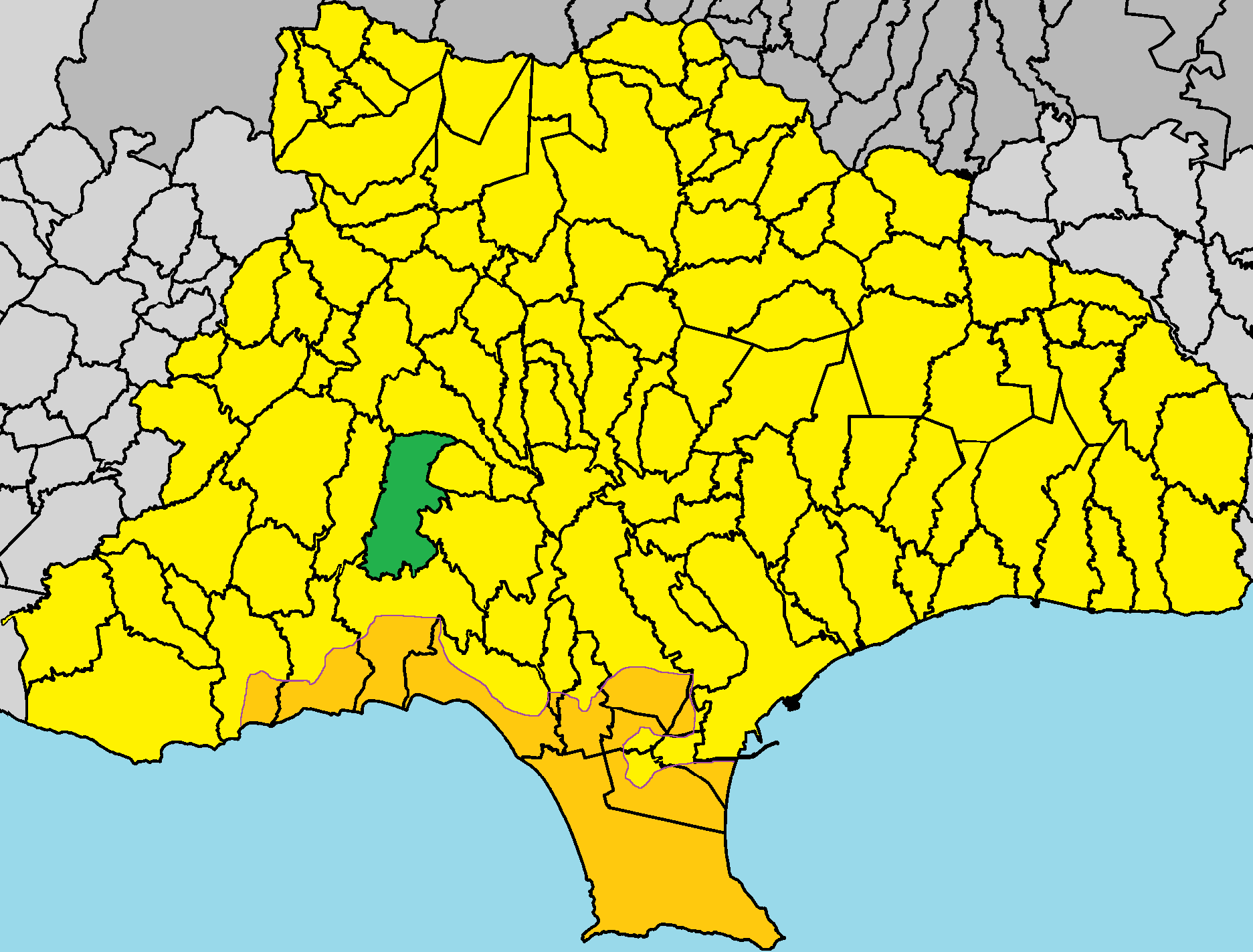
Kivides within Limassol District

Pano Kivides (Greek: Πάνω Κυβίδες) is a village in the Limassol District of Cyprus, located 10 km north of Erimi. Pano Kivides moved to the current location in 1970.
