= Pyrgos, Limassol =

Pyrgos Πύργος
- Village
- Location in Cyprus
- Coordinates: 34°44′34″N 33°11′0″E
- Country: Cyprus
- District: Limassol District

Population (2001)
  - Total: 1,348
- Time zone: UTC+2 (EET)
  - Summer (DST): UTC+3 (EEST)
- Website: http://www.pyrgos.org/

Pyrgos (Greek: Πύργος) is a village east of the town of Limassol, Cyprus. The town has an exit on the A6 Paphos-Larnaca motorway.
