= Wine route =

Specially designated road or waterway that travels through a wine-producing area

The wine route within wine-producing regions, are marked and advertised roads with special signs, along which insist natural, cultural and environmental values, vineyards and cellars of individual or associated farms open to the public. They constitute an instrument through which the wine territories and their productions can be disclosed, marketed and used in the form of a tourist offer.

== Argentina ==
- The Argentina Wine Route

== Austria ==
- Steirische Weinstraße in southern Styria
- Schilcherweinstraße in western Styria

== Canada ==
- Route des vins du Québec (in French)
- Wine Route of Ontario

== Chile ==
- Chilean Wine Routes, a group of routes established through the vineyard valleys of Chile

== Cyprus ==
- Laona – Akamas: Ineia, Pano Arodes and Kathikas with Xynisteri / Maratheftiko
- Vouni Panagias – Ambelitis: Vouni Panagias, Chrysorrogiatissa and Agios Fotios at an altitude of 2,400 feet.
- Diarizos Valley: It sits at a far lower altitude in comparison to other wine growing areas.
- Krasochoria Lemesou: They have the greatest concentration of wineries with Koilani and Omodos as leaders.
- Koumandaria Wine Route: The Koumandaria villages date back to the 12th century. One of the oldest named wines in the world, made from sun dried grapes to enhance their sugar content.
- Pitsilia: The villages in this area, including Pisilia, are spread around the mountain peaks of Madari, Machairas and Papoutsa.
- Nicosia - Larnaka: Located in the mountain area of Larnaca and Nicosia and passes through Skarinou, Kato Lefkara, Pano Lefkara, Kato Drys, Vavla, Ora, Odou, Farmakas, Gourri, Fikardou and Kalo Chorio Orinis.

== France ==
- fr:Route des vins d'Alsace in the Alsace wine region
- Route des vins des Côtes du Rhône in the Rhône wine region

== Germany ==
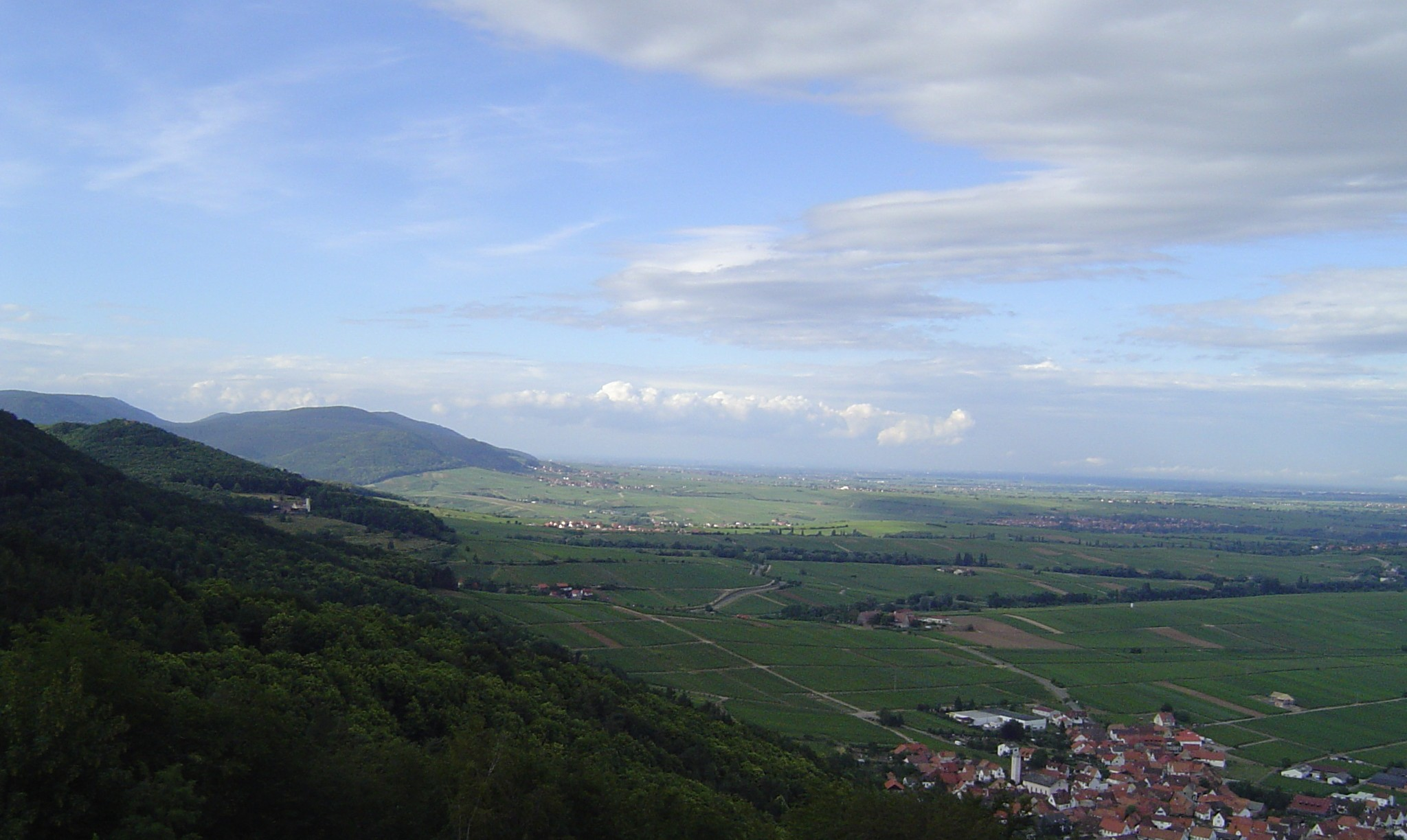
View of the Weinstraße region near Eschbach, Südliche Weinstraße

- German Wine Route in Palatinate wine region, the first such route established
- Badische Weinstraße on the western edge of the Black Forest in Baden
- Bocksbeutelstraße in Franconia
- Elbling-Route along the upper Moselle in the Moselle wine region
- Moselweinstraße along the Moselle in the Moselle wine region
- Rheingauer Rieslingroute in the Rheingau
- Römische Weinstraße northeast of Trier in the Moselle wine region
- Ruwer-Riesling-Route in the Moselle wine region
- Weinstraße Saale-Unstrut in Saxony-Anhalt
- Saar-Riesling-Straße on the lower Saar River in the Moselle wine region
- Sächsische Weinstraße in Saxony
- Weinstraße Mansfelder Seen in Saxony-Anhalt
- Württemberger Weinstraße in Württemberg, established in 2004 including the former Schwäbischen Weinstraße

In addition, the German Wine Route has given the name Weinstraße to the region surrounding the route and to the administrative district (Kreis) of Südliche Weinstraße. Local municipalities sometimes add "an der Weinstraße" to their names.

Weinstraße is also the name of a medieval trading route in Hesse. The name does not refer to wine but to the Hessian for "Wagenstraße" ("cart" or "wagon road," Hessian: We-in, Wän, or Wäng = Wagen).

== Italy ==
=== Apulia ===
- Appia dei vini ("Wine Appian Way")

=== Campania ===
- Amalfi Coast wine route (Strada del vino Costa d'Amalfi)

=== Emilia-Romagna ===
- Colli Piacentini wine route (Strada dei Colli Piacentini)

=== Friuli-Venezia Giulia ===
- Aquileia wine route (Strada del vino di Aquileia)

=== Lazio ===
- Trasimeno Hills wine route (Strada del vino colli del Trasimeno)

=== Lombardy ===
- Lombard Hills wine route (Strada del vino Colli dei Longobardi) in the Province of Brescia
- Strada dei vini e dei sapori del Garda (Strada dei vini e dei sapori del Garda) on Lake Garda

=== Piedmont ===
- Barolo wine route (Strada del Barolo)

=== Sicily ===
- Marsala wine route (Strada del vino di Marsala) in the Province of Trapani
- Etna wine route (Strada dei vini dell'Etna)
- Erice DOC wine route (Strada del vino Erice DOC) in Erice
- Strada del vino Terre Sicane ("Sicanian Lands wine route")
- Val di Mazara wine and taste route (Strada del vino e dei sapori Val di Mazara)
- Cerasuolo di Vittoria wine route (Strada del vino Cerasuolo di Vittoria) in the Val di Noto (see Cerasuolo di Vittoria)

=== Trentino-Alto Adige ===
- South Tyrol wine route (Italian: Strada del vino dell'Alto Adige; German: Südtiroler Weinstraße) in South Tyrol

=== Tuscany ===
- Vino Nobile di Montepulciano wine route (Strada del vino Nobile di Montepulciano)

=== Umbria ===
- Cantico wine route (Strada dei vini del Cantico)

=== Veneto ===
- Euganean Hills wine route (Strada del vino dei Colli Euganei) on the Euganean Hills
- Prosecco and Conegliano Hills–Valdobbiadene wine route (Strada del prosecco e vini dei Colli di Conegliano Valdobbiadene)
- Soave wine route (Strada del vino Soave)

== Luxembourg ==
- Wäistrooss (Luxembourgish) / Route du vin (French) / Luxemburger Weinstraße (German)

== Mexico ==
- Ensenada Ruta del Vino (Wine Route)
- Querétaro Ruta del Vino

== New Zealand ==
- Classic New Zealand Wine Trail

== Spain ==
- Ribera del Duero Ruta del Vino
- Rioja Alavesa Ruta del Vino
- Somontano Ruta del Vino, in the foothills of the Pyrenees

== Turkey ==
- Thrace Vineyard Route: Established in the early 2010s, this route connects boutique wineries across four main districts: Kırklareli (Strandja Mountains), Tekirdağ, Şarköy, and the Gelibolu Peninsula. It is known for high-quality reds and proximity to Istanbul.
- Urla Vineyard Route: Located on the peninsula near İzmir, this route links several boutique wineries that emphasize sustainable agriculture and agrotourism. It is a destination for gastronomy, often associated with the region's farm-to-table restaurants.
- Cappadocia Vineyard Route: Connecting wineries in Uçhisar, Ürgüp, and Gülşehir, this route is famous for its volcanic terroir and tuff-carved wine cellars.
- Çal Vineyard Route: Located in the Denizli Province, this route focuses on high-altitude vineyards near Pamukkale and is a major center for the production of the Çalkarası and Sultaniye grapes.
- Ancient Lydia Vineyard Route: A route currently under development in the Manisa and Kula regions (Inner Aegean), focusing on the area's volcanic geography and ancient viticultural history.
- Ancient Troy Vineyard Route: A route currently under development in the Çanakkale and Ezine region (North Aegean), linking the vineyards of the Troad peninsula with the archaeological site of Troy.
