= Zoopigi =

Zoopigi Ζωοπηγή (Greek)
- Village
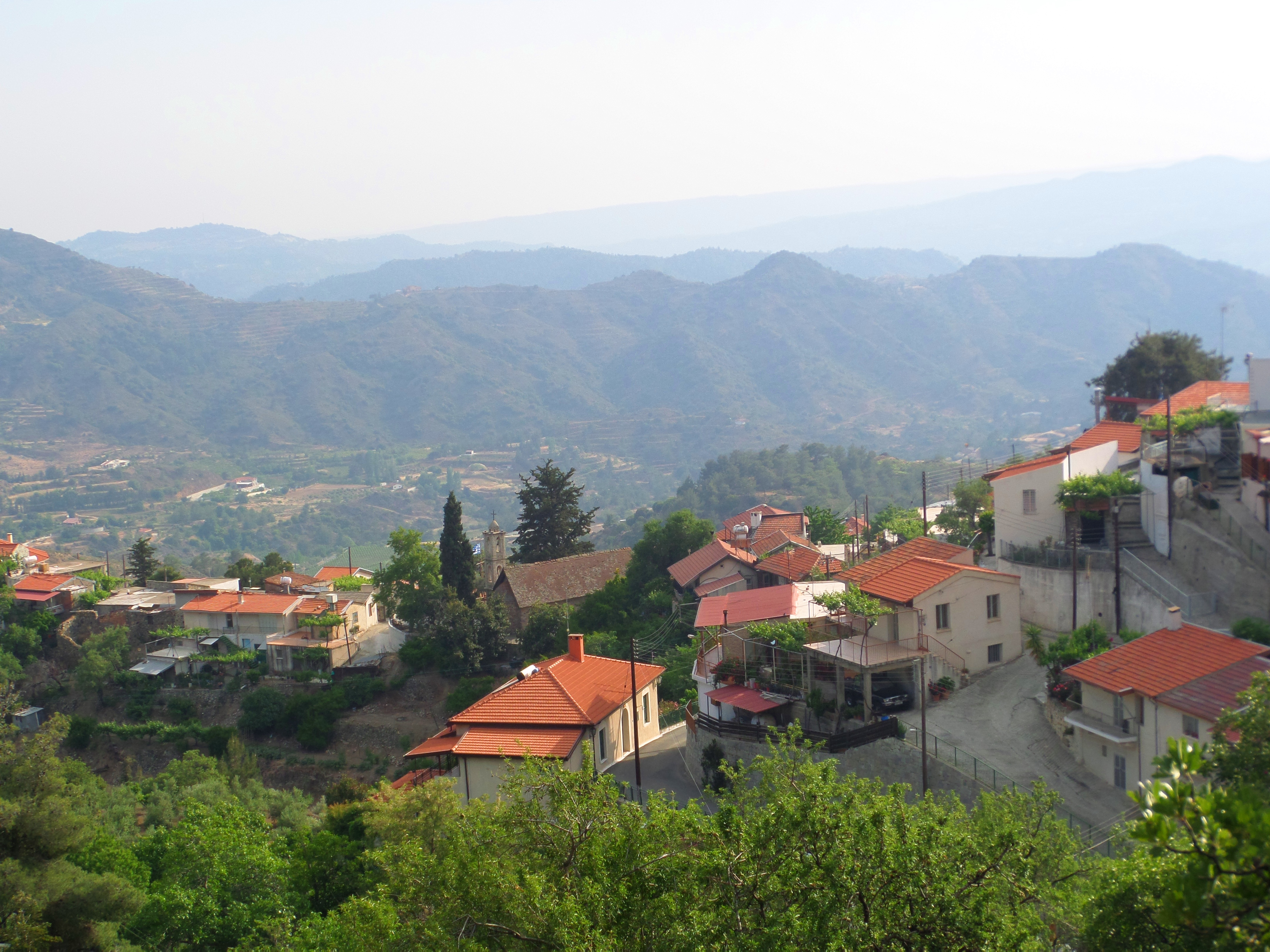
- The church from above

- Location in Cyprus
- Coordinates: 34°51′47″N 33°0′54″E
- Country: Cyprus
- District: Limassol District

Population (2001)
  - Total: 160
- Time zone: UTC+2 (EET)
  - Summer (DST): UTC+3 (EEST)

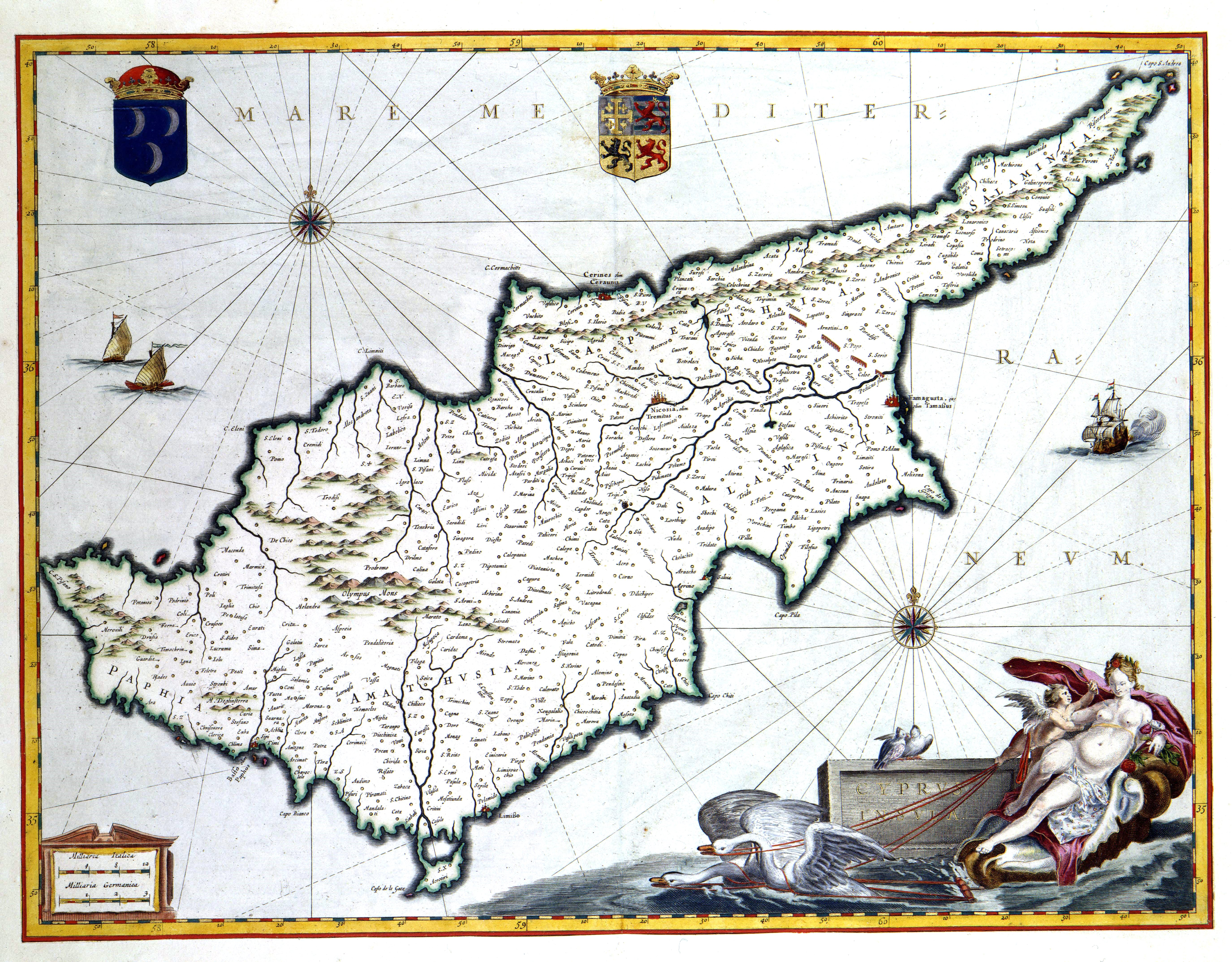
Zoopigi written as Zopÿ in 1690 (Map: Atlas Van der Hagen)

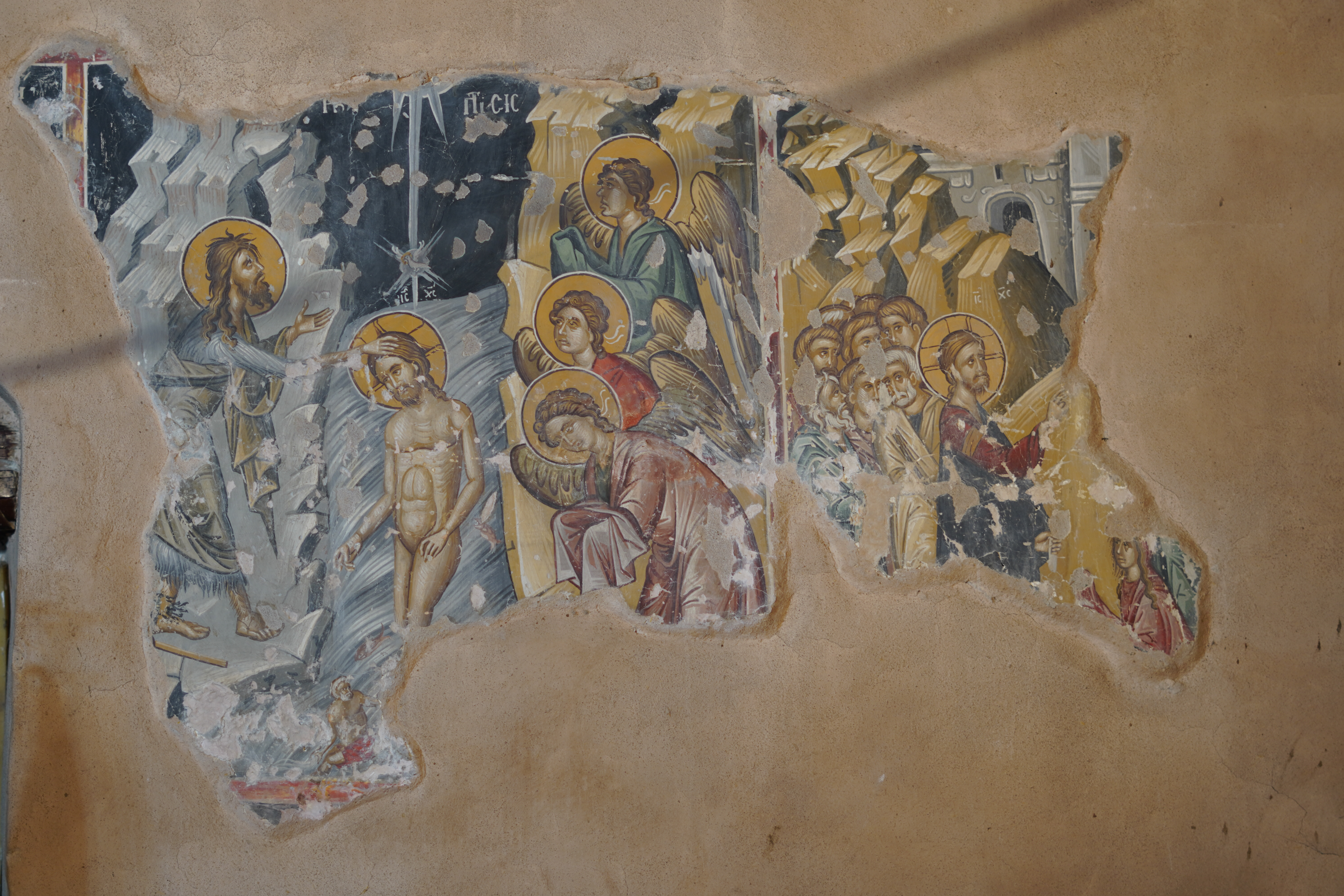
The Baptism of Christ and the Raising of Lazarus. 15th century fresco from the church of Zoodohos Pigi.

Zoopigi (Greek: Ζωοπηγή) is a village one kilometre north of Kalo Chorio in the Limassol District of Cyprus. The village has three churches: Saint Nektarios church, Saint Marina church and church of St. Mary of the Spring (Zoodohos pigi), hence the name Zoopigi. The church of St. Mary of the Spring is the oldest of the three, being built in the 13th century, it has a rich ecclesiastical history such as having frescoes from both the 13th and the 15th century and the icon of the Virgin Hodegetria of the 13th century amongst many more. It is single-aisled wooden church covered with a large gabled roof which is the same type as the church of Saint Marina. The church of Saint Marina was built in 1733 and was previously used as the school building of the village. The church of Saint Nektarios church is new, built in the 20th century. The village also has a Commandaria Museum.

== Location ==
Zoopigi is located 24 kilometres north of Limassol, in the agricultural region of Pitsilia. It is built at an altitude of 850 metres above sea level. It borders Kalo Chorio to the south, Agios Mamas to the south-west, Pelendri to the north-west, Agios Ioannis to the north, and Agios Theodoros to the north-east.

== Natural Environment ==
The village's cultivated land includes vineyards, olive groves, almond trees, vegetable plots and fruit trees. A significant product of the area is Commandaria wine.

== History ==
According to Nearchos Clerides, Zoopigi was founded during the period of Venetian rule, making it one of the newer villages of Cyprus. Written sources attest to the existence of the village in the second half of the 16th century. Earlier, a settlement known as Orogou was established at a short distance from Zoopigi. Its inhabitants later moved further north and founded Zoopigi, most likely due to the availability of water and fertile land in the area. Orogou continued to exist until the mid-19th century, when it was abandoned by its last inhabitants, who relocated to Zoopigi and the neighbouring village of Kalo Chorio.

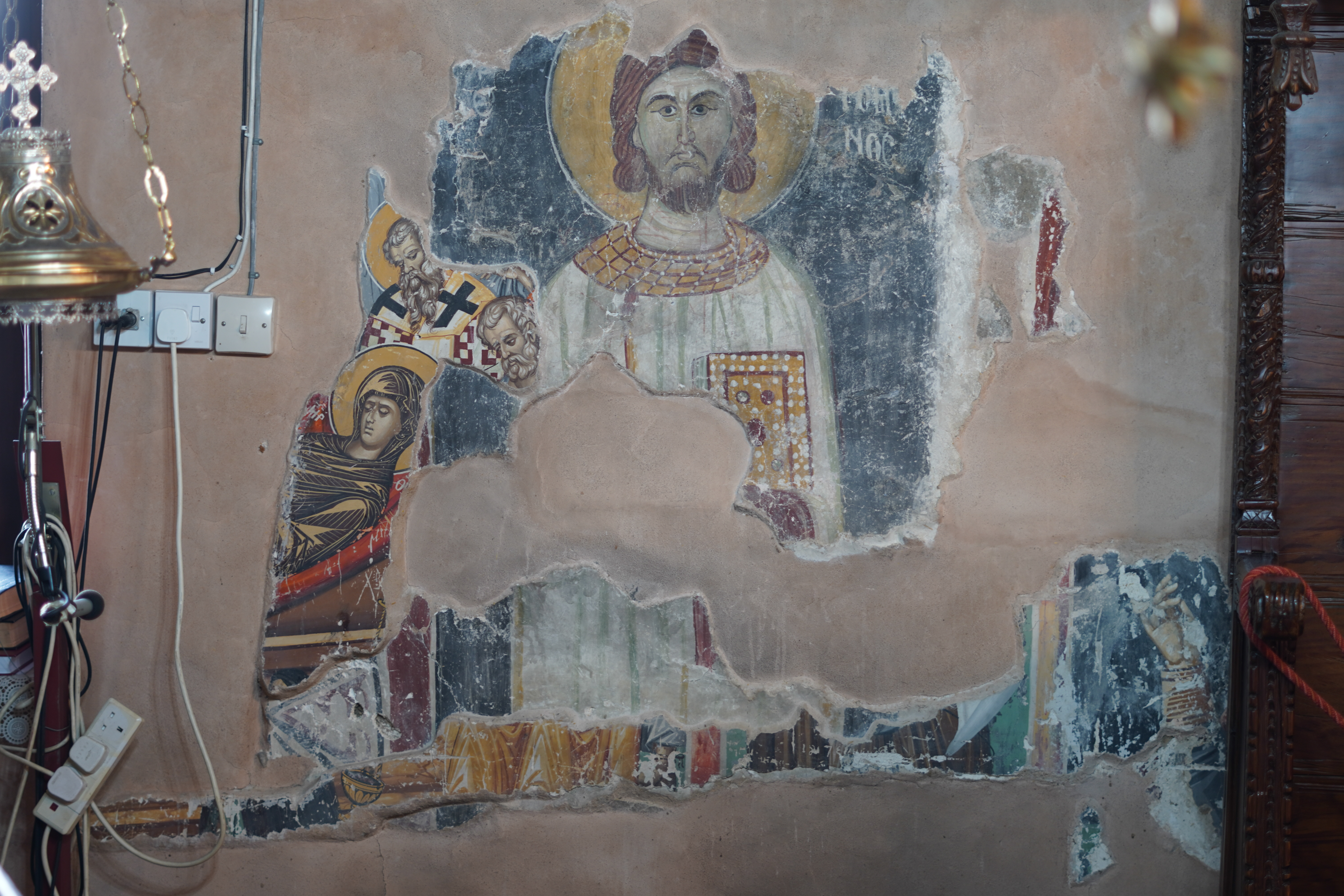
Saint Roman the Melodist, 13th century, Dormition of the Virgin Mary, unidentified monk, unidentified hierarch, 15th century, church of Zoodohos Pigi.

== Sourcing ==
- Καρούζης, Γιώργος (2001). Περιδιαβάζοντας την Κύπρο: Λεμεσός (πόλη και επαρχία) [Wandering Around Cyprus: Limassol (City and District)] (πρώτη ed.). Λευκωσία: ΣΕΛΑΣ Κεντρο Μελετων Ερευνων & Εκδοσεων. p. 161-163. ISBN 9963-566-67-7.
