= Commandaria =

Amber-coloured sweet dessert wine

Commandaria wine
- Wine region
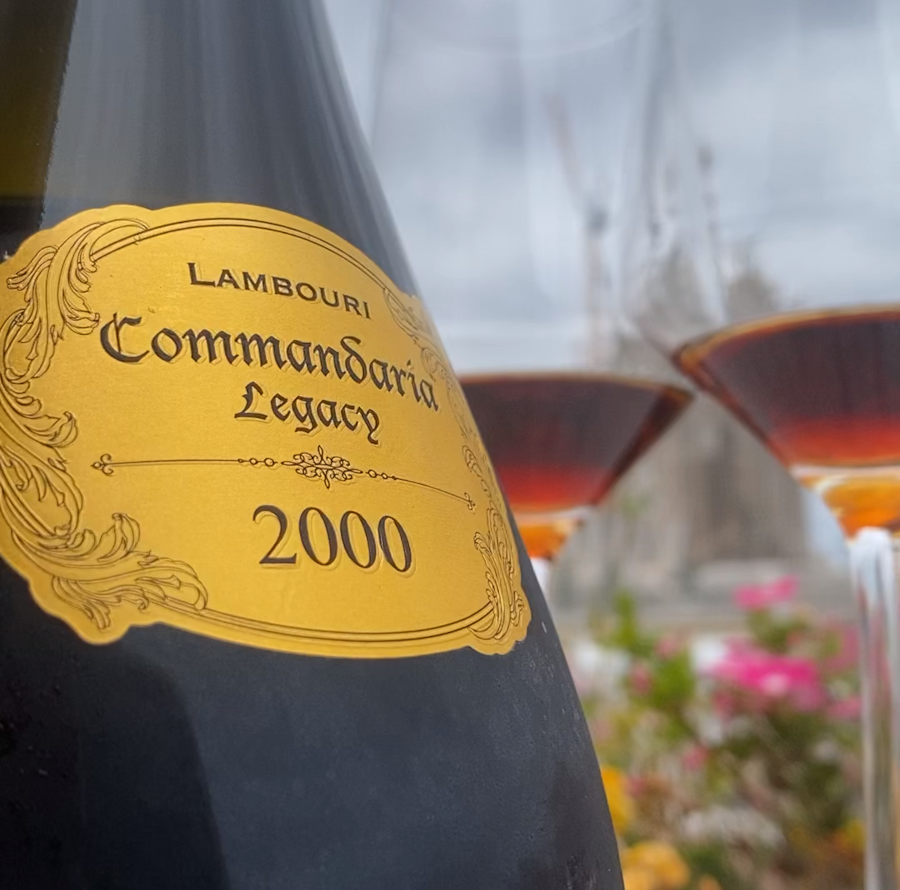
- Close-up of a Legacy 2000 Commandaria wine bottle and wine glass
- Type: Protected designation of origin
- Country: Cyprus
- Varietals produced: Xynisteri and Mavro

Commandaria wine
- UNESCO Intangible Cultural Heritage
- Country: Cyprus
- Reference: 02288
- Region: Europe and North America

Inscription history
- Inscription: 2025 (20th session)
- List: Representative

Commandaria Greek: κουμανδαρία, κουμανταρία is an amber-coloured sweet dessert wine made in the Commandaria region of Cyprus on the foothills of the Troödos Mountains.

Commandaria is made from sun-dried grapes of the varieties Xynisteri and Mavro. While often a fortified wine, through its production method it often reaches high alcohol levels, around 15%, already before fortification.

It represents an ancient wine style documented in Cyprus back to 800 BCE and has the distinction of being the world's oldest named wine still in production, with the name Commandaria dating back to the crusades in the 12th century.

In December 2025, Commandaria was inscribed on UNESCO’s Representative List of the Intangible Cultural Heritage of Humanity, a recognition tied to the wine’s continuing production traditions in the 14 Commandaria villages.

== History ==
The wine has a long history, said to date back to the time of the ancient Greeks, when it was a popular drink at festivals. A dried grape wine from Cyprus was first known to be described in 800 BCE by the Greek poet Hesiod and was known much later as the Cypriot Manna.

Commandaria by KEO

During the crusades, Commandaria was served at the 12th-century wedding of King Richard the Lionheart to Berengaria of Navarre, in the town of Limassol; it was during the wedding that King Richard pronounced Commandaria "the wine of kings and the king of wines". Near the end of the century he sold the island to the Knights Templar, who then sold it to Guy de Lusignan, but kept a large feudal estate at Kolossi, close to Limassol, to themselves.

This estate was referred to as "La Grande Commanderie". The word Commanderie referred to the military headquarters whilst Grande helped distinguish it from two smaller such command posts on the island, one close to Paphos (Phoenix) and another near Kyrenia (Templos). This area under the control of the Knights Templar (and subsequently the Knights Hospitaller) became known as Commandaria. When the knights began producing large quantities of the wine for export to Europe's royal courts and for supplying pilgrims en route to the holy lands, the wine assumed the name of the region. Thus it has the distinction of being the world's oldest named wine still in production.

Although today it is produced and marketed under the name Commandaria, it has been referred to with several similar names and spellings in the past. In 1863, Thomas George Shaw in his book Wine, the vine, and the cellar refers to this wine as Commanderi whilst in 1879, Samuel Baker refers to it as Commanderia. In 1833 Cyrus Redding in his book "A history and description of modern wines" makes reference to the wine of the "Commandery".

Legend has it that in the 13th century Philip Augustus of France held the first ever wine tasting competition. The event, branded The Battle of the Wines (fr. La Bataille des Vins), was recorded in a notable French poem written by Henry d'Andeli in 1224. The competition which included wines from all over Europe and France, was won by a sweet wine from Cyprus widely believed to be Commandaria. The Commandery region itself fell into the control of his descendant Philip IV in 1307, after the suppression of the Knights Templar.

Another legend has it that the Ottoman sultan Selim II invaded the island just to acquire Commandaria; also that the grapes used to make this wine were the same grapes exported to Portugal that eventually became famous as the source of port wine.

In October 2025, Cyprus announced that it had formally submitted Commandaria for inscription on UNESCO’s Intangible Cultural Heritage list.The nomination formed part of broader efforts to document the wine’s traditional production practices. In December 2024, Commandaria was inscribed on UNESCO’s list.

== Production ==
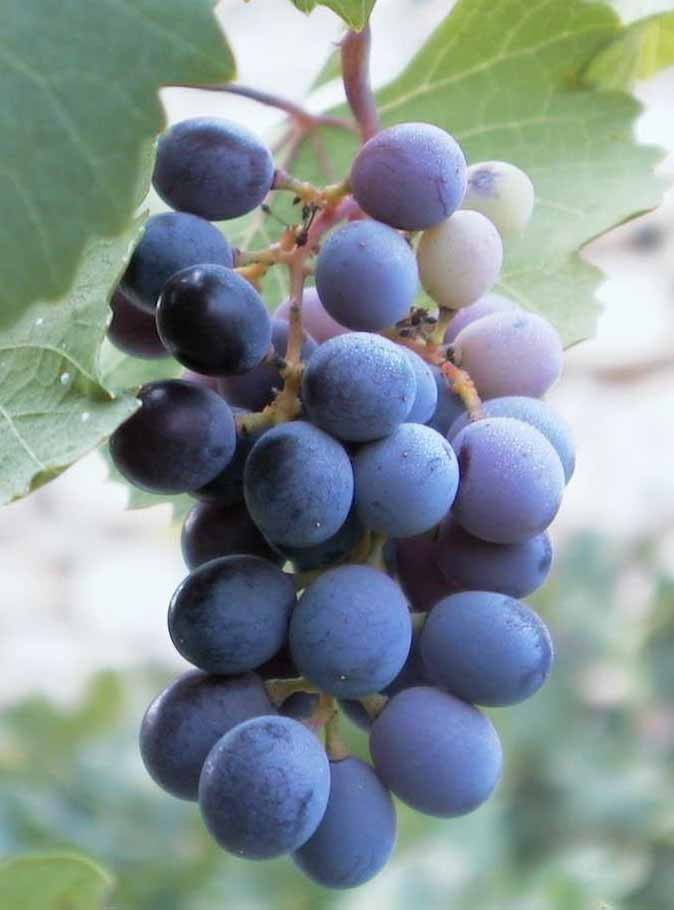
Mavro grapes used in the production of Commandaria.

Commandaria is made exclusively from two types of indigenous Cyprus grapes: Xynisteri and Mavro. The grapes are left to overripen on the vine and when sugar content reaches acceptable levels (corresponding to high must weight) they are harvested. More specifically, Xynisteri is picked when at around 12 degrees Baumé (°Bé) and Mavro at 15-16 °Bé. The grapes are then laid out in the sun to further increase the sugar density through evaporation. When the must weight reaches 19 to 23 °Bé the juice is extracted through crushing and pressing. Fermentation takes place in reservoirs and will arrest naturally due to the high levels of alcohol achieved at around 15%. The above process has to take place within the confines of 14 designated villages that lie in the Commandaria Region (see below). Commandaria, by law, is aged for at least two years in oak barrels, but this can take place outside the above-designated area within Cyprus under strict control and under the conditions laid down in Cypriot legislation.

Once fermentation has been completed, at a minimum alcohol level of 10% (which is often exceeded), the alcoholic strength of Commandaria may be increased by the addition of pure 95% grape alcohol or a wine distillate of at least 70% alcohol to a minimum of 15% of alcohol. However, after this addition, the wine's actual alcohol content may not exceed 20%, while its total potential alcohol (including its sugar content) must be at least 22.5%. Thus, Commandaria may be a fortified wine, but fortification is not mandatory.

Xynisteri grapes.

The origins of the production method are not definite. In his poem Works and Days, written in the 7th century BC, Hesiod, writes:

Forget not next the ripen'd Grapes to lay, Ten Nights in Air, nor take them in by Day; Five more remember, e're the Wine is made, To let them ly, to mellow in the Shade; And in the sixth briskly yourself employ, To cask the Gift of Bacchus, Sire of Joy."

Pliny the Elder describes similar methods employed by the Greeks for making sweet wines,

The grapes are left on the vine to dry in the sun...It is made by drying grapes in the sun, and then placing them for seven days in a closed place upon hurdles, some seven Feet from the ground, care being taken to protect them at night from the dews: on the eighth day they are trodden out: this method, it is said, produces a liquor of exquisite bouquet and flavour. The liquor known as melitites is also one of the sweet wines

In his account, Samuel Baker describes the production in 1879

...the commanderia grapes are collected and spread upon the flat mud-plastered roofs of the native houses and are exposed for several days until they show symptoms of shriveling in the skin, and the stalks have partially dried: they are then pressed……"

He claims that the evolution of this method was more out of necessity than choice.....

"It has been imagined by some travellers that the grapes are purposely dried before pressing; on the other hand, I have been assured by the inhabitants that their only reason for heaping and exposing their crop upon the house-tops is the danger of leaving it to ripen in the vineyard. None of the plots are fenced, and before the grapes are sufficiently ripe for pressing they are stolen in large quantities, or destroyed by cattle, goats, mules, and every stray animal that is attracted to the fields…."

Commandaria is produced by the large wine industries (KEO, LOEL, and SODAP) and by a few small local producers of the Commandaria appellation zone (see below). Nowadays more modern wineries are producing high-quality Commandaria (Aes Ambelis, Ayia Mavri, Karseras, Lionspirit, Oenou Yi, Tsiakkas, Kyperounda, Revecca).

Data recorded by Samuel Baker in his book Cyprus - How I saw it in 1879 reveal that in the late 19th century Cyprus had an annual production of about 300,000 okes, equivalent to about 385,000 litres (data reflects only duty-paid production). Of this, Cyprus exported 180,103 okes from Limassol Port, of which the vast majority went to Austria (155,000 okes valued at UK£2,075).

Official figures released by Cyprus’ Vines Products Commission show that there is a generally increasing trend in the volumes produced. Much of Commandaria production is still targeted for export.

Year	1878	1879	2001	2002	2003	2004	2005
Total Production (in kilograms of grapes processed)	150,000	385,000	253,495	155,925	209,250	564,179	449,290
Total Exports (in litres)	200,000		228,369	210,953	189,384	189,236	82,728

More recent reporting has provided additional context on production scale and market conditions. In 2025, Commandaria annual production was reported to have hovered at around 200,000 bottles, reflecting weaker demand and the wine’s limited position in international markets. The same reporting noted efforts by small Cypriot wineries to revive traditional Commandaria-making techniques and increase the wine’s visibility.

== Authentication ==
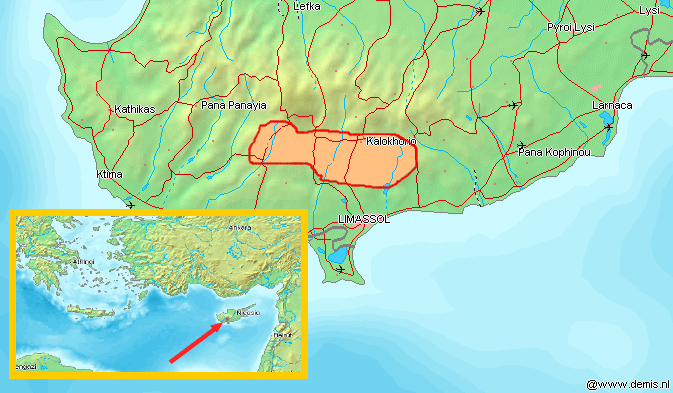
Map of SW Cyprus outlining the Commandaria region

Currently Commandaria holds a protected designation of origin (PDO) within the European Union, the United States and Canada. By Cypriot legislation passed on 2 March 1990, it is only produced in a collection of 14 neighbouring villages: Agios Georgios, Agios Konstantinos, Agios Mamas, Agios Pavlos, Apsiou, Gerasa, Doros, Zoopigi, Kalo Chorio, Kapilio, Laneia, Louvaras, Monagri and Silikou. The designated area has assumed the name of the Commandaria Region and is located on the south-facing slopes of the Troödos Mountains at an altitude of 500-900m within the Limassol District. Only grapes from vineyards that have been planted for at least 4 years are allowed. Vine training must follow the goblet method and watering is prohibited. The grape harvest may only commence after the vine products commission of Cyprus has given the green light, based on the average sugar content of the grapes. Xinisteri grapes must demonstrate a sugar content of 212 g/L whilst Mavro can only qualify with a reading of 258 g/L and above. The sugar concentration is then raised by laying the grapes in the sun, usually for 7–10 days, to a strict window of 390 to 450g/L.

In addition to regulatory protections, the Commandaria region has been featured in contemporary travel and wine coverage through the “Commandaria Wine Route”, which links wineries and heritage sites and includes organized visits, tastings and cultural events.

In February 2006, an event was celebrated in conjunction with Wine Products Association of Cyprus and the official Commandaria wine glass was selected, from the Diva collection with code number 8015/4, manufactured by Schott-Zwiesel, the Bavarian wine glass company.

== See also ==
- Cyprus wine
- Mavro grape
- Straw wine
- Xynisteri grape
