= Pachna =

Pachna Πάχνα
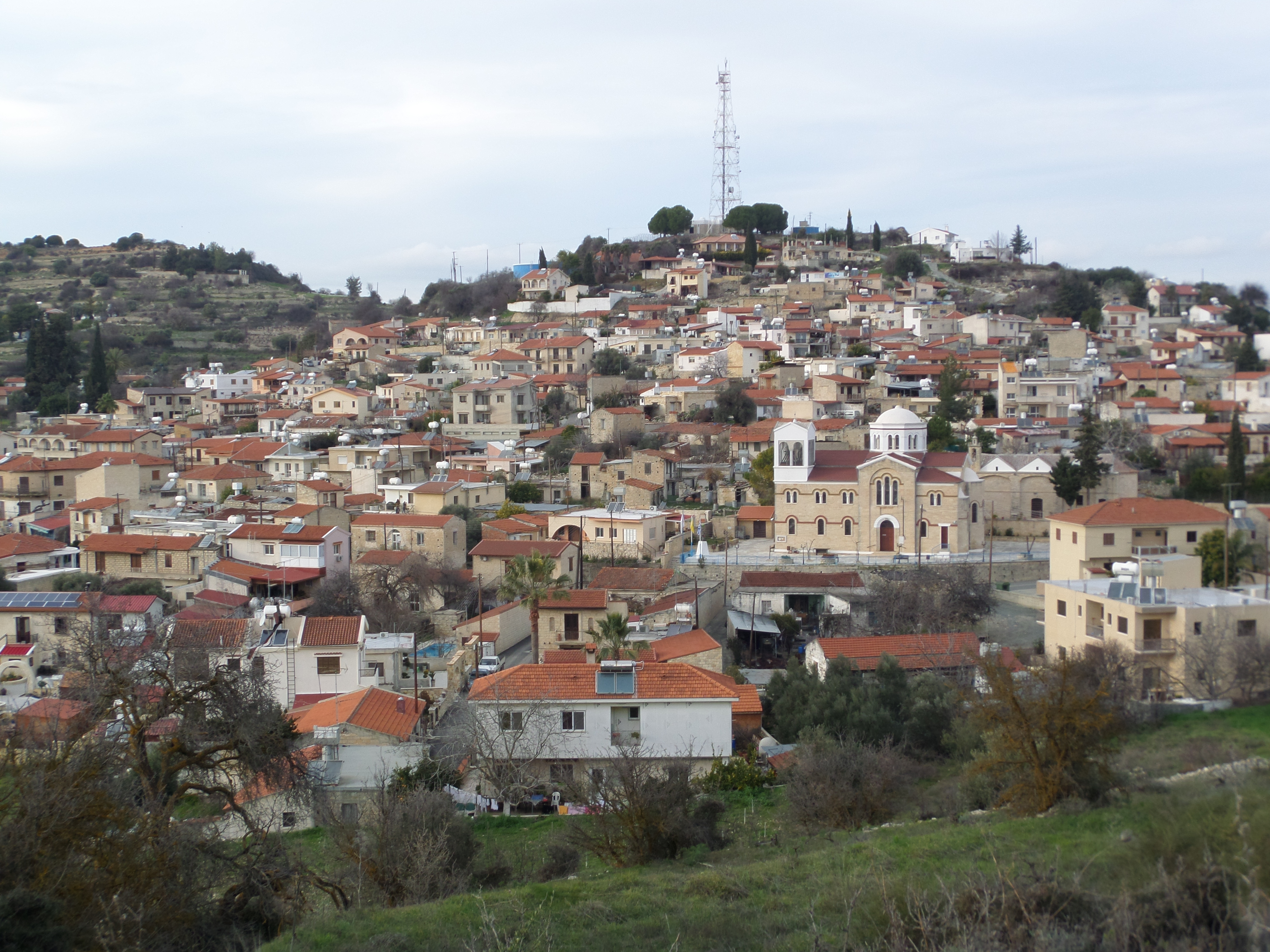

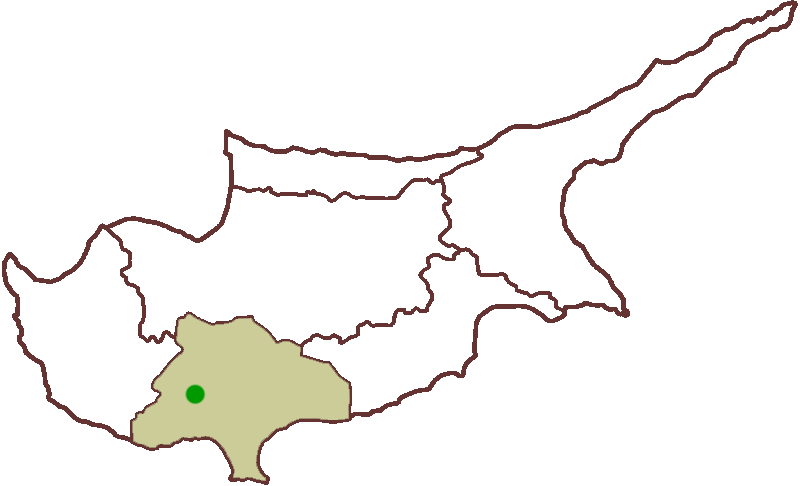
- Coordinates: 34°46′42″N 32°47′35″E
- Country: Cyprus
- District: Limassol District

Government
  - Mayor: Andreas Savva
- Elevation: 745 m (2,444 ft)

Population (2001)
  - Total: 865
- Time zone: UTC+2 (EET)
  - Summer (DST): UTC+3 (EEST)
- Postal code: 4700
- Website: http://www.pachnavillage.com

Pachna (Pakhna, Πάχνα) is a village in the Limassol District of the Republic of Cyprus. It is situated on the south slopes of the Troödos mountain range at an altitude of 745 m (2447 ft).

The name Pachna is thought to originate from the ancient Greek word “πάχνη” (pachni) which relates to the morning white frost found on leaves following a chilly night. Another explanation could come from the alternative meaning of “πάχνη”, a manger, in reference to its protected location amidst the surrounding high hills. During the Frankish and Venetian occupations of Cyprus the village appeared on maps under the name of Padena.

Chalky soil, its elevation and climate, have made Pachna an ideal location for viticulture. By 1985 statistics 830 hectares of land were registered with the agriculture department as cultivated with wine or table vines, making it the largest grape producing village on the island. Evidence that vines have been cultivated here since ancient times came from pottery found in excavations nearby (at Ayia Marina settlement). The vast majority of the cultivated grapes are the local varieties of mavro and xynisteri. Less common is the cultivation of olives, carobs, apples, pears and lentils.

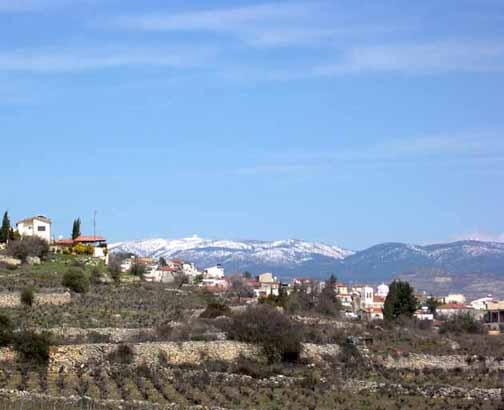
Pachna with Mount Olympus in the background

Census statistics show that from 1881 to 1960 (during the British occupation of the island) the population increased steadily from 595 to 1564. Currently the population stands at 865 (October 2011 census).

The village has two main churches, St George (Ayios Yeorgios) and St Paul (Apostolos Pavlos). The first primary school was established in 1855 and moved to its current location in 1938. Most of these older buildings (and many houses) are built in the local Pachna stone which has its own unique chalky yellow character.

== Climate ==
Climate data for Pachna (745 metres above sea level)
Month	Jan	Feb	Mar	Apr	May	Jun	Jul	Aug	Sep	Oct	Nov	Dec	Year
Mean daily maximum °C (°F)	11.8 (53.2)	12.3 (54.1)	16.9 (62.4)	19.7 (67.5)	22.5 (72.5)	26.6 (79.9)	28.9 (84.0)	29.4 (84.9)	26.4 (79.5)	21.2 (70.2)	15.5 (59.9)	13.6 (56.5)	20.4 (68.7)
Mean daily minimum °C (°F)	4.1 (39.4)	3.6 (38.5)	7.2 (45.0)	11.4 (52.5)	14.8 (58.6)	17.6 (63.7)	19.2 (66.6)	18.8 (65.8)	16.8 (62.2)	14.1 (57.4)	8.9 (48.0)	6.2 (43.2)	11.9 (53.4)
Average precipitation mm (inches)	137.3 (5.41)	99.4 (3.91)	75.1 (2.96)	40.3 (1.59)	15.5 (0.61)	2.2 (0.09)	0.9 (0.04)	3.5 (0.14)	13.2 (0.52)	40.7 (1.60)	85.1 (3.35)	150.4 (5.92)	663.6 (26.13)
Average precipitation days	15.6	13.1	10.4	8.1	3.5	1.5	0.7	1.8	3.2	7.5	9.9	16.2	91.5
Average snowy days	2	2	1	0	0	0	0	0	0	0	0	1	6
