= Agios Mamas =

Agios Mamas may refer to:

- Agios Mamas, Chalkidiki, Greece
- Agios Mamas, Limassol, Cyprus
