= KEO (company) =

European beverage company

KEO (Κυπριακή Εταιρία Οίνων)
- Type: Private, LLC
- Industry: Food
- Founded: 1927
- Headquarters: Limassol, Cyprus
- Area served: Cyprus
- Key people: Charalambos Panayiotou; CEO
- Products: Beverages
- Revenue: €62,969,439 (2004)
- Number of employees: 420
- Subsidiaries: Etien Wines Spirits & Tobacco Ltd; KEO (UK) Ltd; Sun Island Canning Ltd; ΚΕΟ Distilling Ltd
- Website: http://www.keogroup.com/

KEO plc, the Greek abbreviation for Cyprus Wine Company (Greek: Κυπριακή Εταιρία Οίνων), is a European beverage company based on the island of Cyprus. It was formed in 1927 and it represents one of the largest industrial employers on the island with more than 90 brands in its portfolio. Its shares are traded on the Cyprus Stock Exchange.

== History ==
KEO is public limited company was formed in 1927. It is a member of the Hellenic Mining Group whose varied interests in mining, cement production, consumer goods and banking make it the largest industrial group in Cyprus. Reflecting its name, it started off as a company producing wine in the Limassol district. In 1951, it ventured into beer production by importing expertise from Czechoslovakia. Its product range has since expanded to include dessert wines (e.g. Commandaria), bottled water, brandy, spirits (including zivania), juices and canned food. The company is also an active participant at the annual Limassol wine festival. The company, till today, markets a wide variety of alcoholic and non-alcoholic products locally and in over thirty countries worldwide. Following Cyprus’ accession to the European Union in 2004, KEO expanded its operations on continental Europe. Its shares are listed on the Cyprus Stock Exchange. Since 2013, the CEO of KEO is Charalambos Panayiotou.

Keo delivery truck

== Divisions ==
KEO operates six trading divisions that include:

- Beer
- Wines
- Spirits
- Water
- Juices and soft drinks
- Canned food

Its portfolio comprises both local and international brands.

== Wine production ==
KEO operates four different wineries across four different vineyards – situated at an altitude of approximately 1,000 meters above sea level.

Topographic map of Cyprus. Troodos Mountains

- Krasochoria region of the Troodos Mountains range vineyards
- Malia vineyards (mainly planted with Cabernet Sauvignon, Cabernet Franc, Lefkada, Chardonnay and Riesling)
- Pera Pedi vineyards
- Arsos LAONA vineyards

Its wineries are among the first to be built on the island. All four wineries are in close proximity to the vineyards where research is carried out in an effort to increase and safeguard the varieties of grapes, selecting those that will yield the best quality of wine when grown under the local climate. KEO has historically experimented with varieties and cultivation methods whilst it has invested a great deal of resources into rediscovering Cyprus indigenous grape varieties of Mavro and Xynisteri, many of which date back to the classical times, a period when the Cypriot wine reflected the island’s heritage.

== KEO beer ==
Production of KEO – a Pilsner type lager beer – started early in 1951. The original brewery had a small production capacity of about 300,000 gallons annually. In order to meet the ever-increasing demand, the company has carried out substantial extensions to the plant and the equipment now being the most up-to-date machinery in the brewing industry. The brewery is currently capable of producing over 30,000 hectoliters of beer monthly. Keo beer was awarded a Gold Medal by the Brewing Industry International Awards. In 2015 KEO Light won “Best New Product” award from the IN Business Magazine. The winners were chosen by public voting and a special committee.

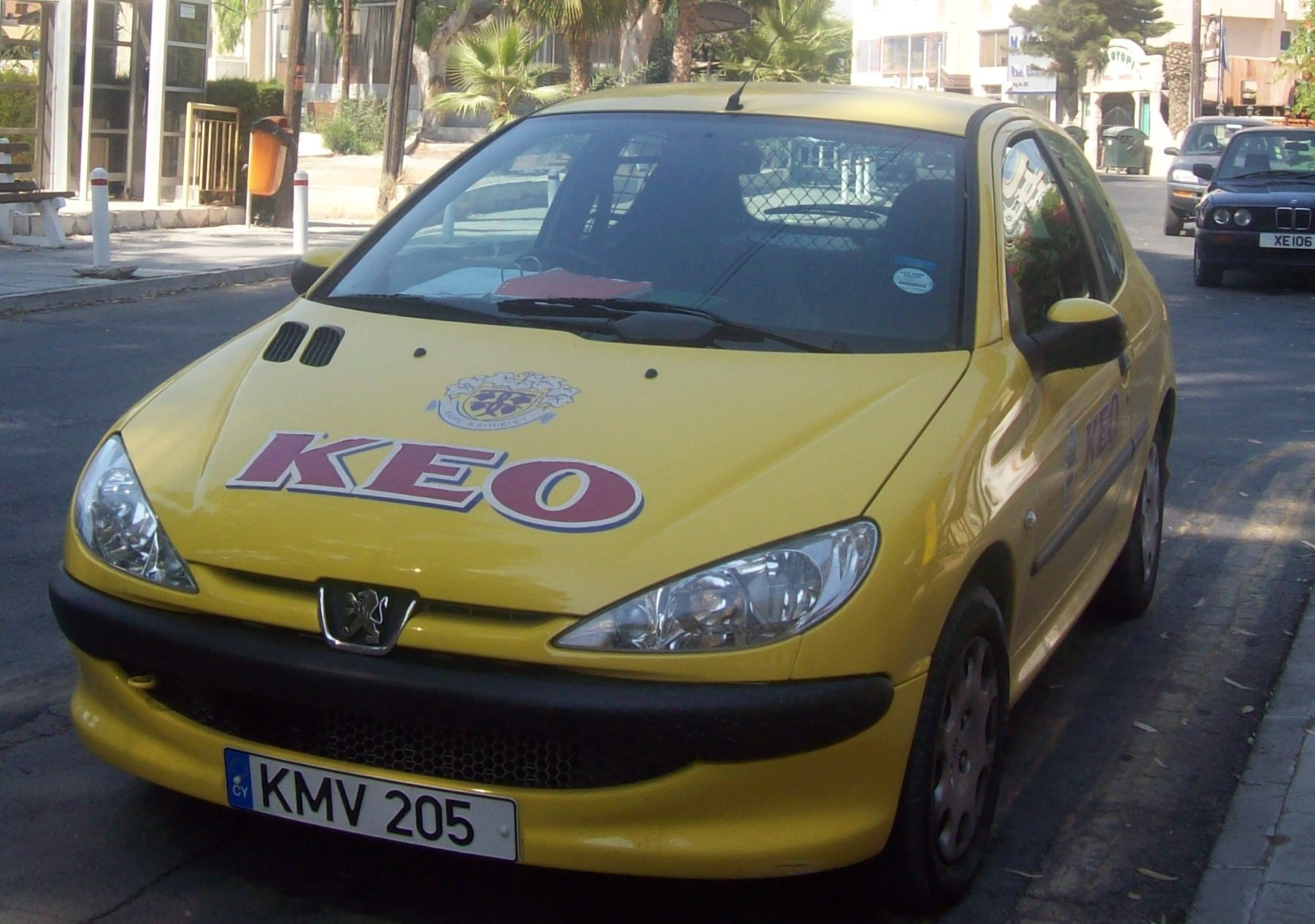
KEO delivery city car in Limassol, Cyprus

== Juice production ==
SWS and Sun Island are among the island’s leading fruit juice producers. Their range of products and activities extends from fruit juices to canned fruit and vegetable. Similar with KEO wineries, the two companies cultivate their own citrus plantations in addition to absorbing a great amount of local fruits produced.

== Sponsorship ==
In 2016, KEO announced the sponsorship of the Cyprus national football team. KEO will support the team throughout its efforts in the qualifying stages of the World Cup 2018. KEO's collaboration with the Cyprus Football Association aims to strengthen and unify the fans of the sport and all those honoring the island state internationally.

== Controversy ==
In 2010 the appearance of KEO beer in an American pornographic film sparked strong reactions by the largest shareholders (20%), the Orthodox Church of Cyprus.
