= Kapilio =

Kapilio Καπηλιό
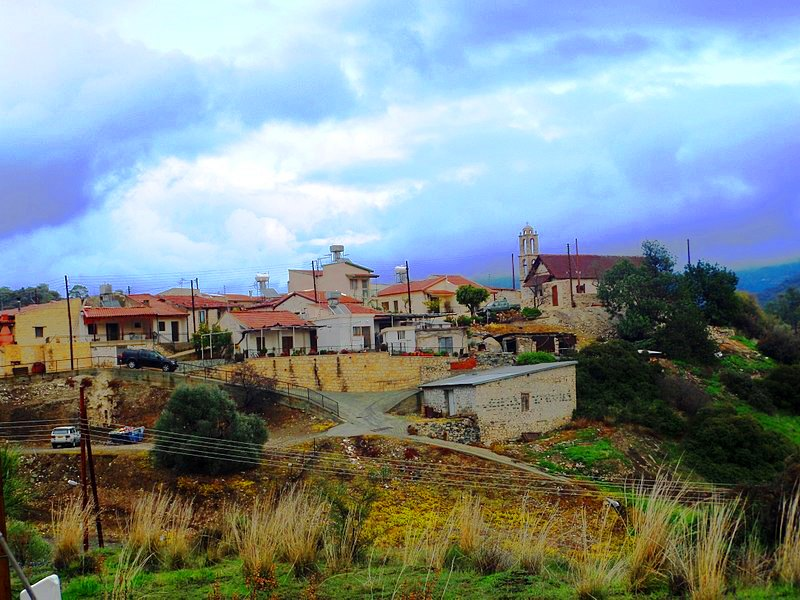
- View of Kapilio from the north

- Location of Kapilio in Cyprus
- Coordinates: 34°49′57″N 32°57′30″E
- Country: Cyprus
- District: Limassol
- Elevation: 550 m (1,800 ft)

Population (2001)
  - Total: 30
- Postal code: 4544

Kapilio (Greek: Καπηλιό) is a small village in the Limassol region of Cyprus. It is located in the area famous for its Commandaria wine, built on a slight elevation in the valley of the Ambelikos river to the east of the Troodos mountain range.

The main village church is dedicated to Saint George the Triumphant (Greek: Άγιος Γεώργιος ο Τροπαιοφόρος) and dates to the 12th century. There are two other smaller churches in the settlement, both dedicated to The Virgin, (The Virgin of the Vineyards and the Virgin of the Baths).

Local inhabitants are mainly involved in viticulture as well as a growing almonds and other fruit trees and the village was famous in the past for its peaches.
