= Agios Pavlos, Cyprus =

Agios Pavlos Άγιος Παύλος
- Village
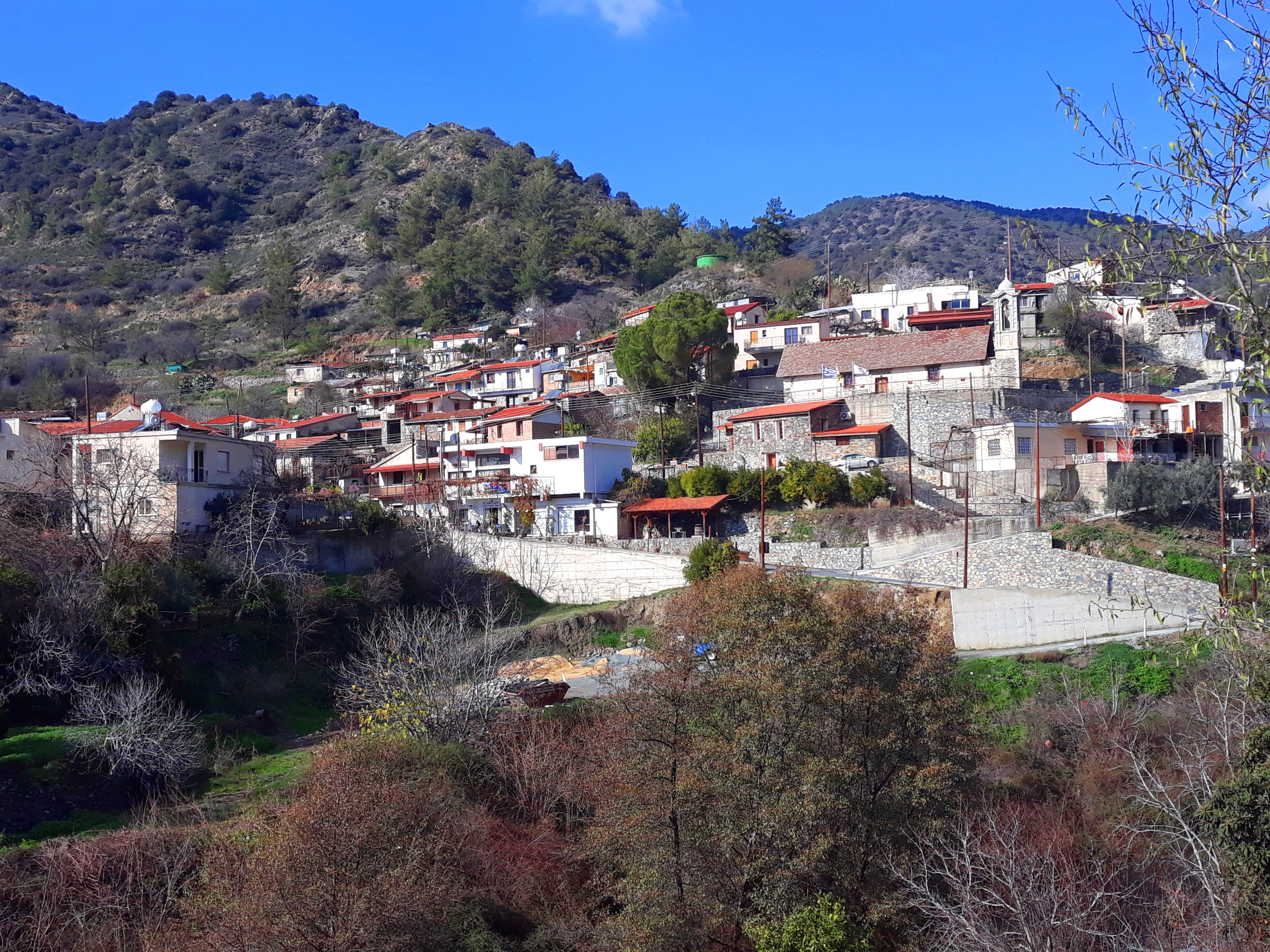

- Location in Cyprus
- Coordinates: 34°51′49″N 33°02′47″E
- Country: Cyprus
- District: Limassol District
- Elevation: 2,142 ft (653 m)

Population (2001)
  - Total: 152
- Time zone: UTC+2 (EET)
  - Summer (DST): UTC+3 (EEST)

Agios Pavlos (Greek: Άγιος Παύλος) is a village in the Limassol District of Cyprus, located 4 km east of Kalo Chorio.
