= Apsiou =

Apsiou Αψιού
- Village
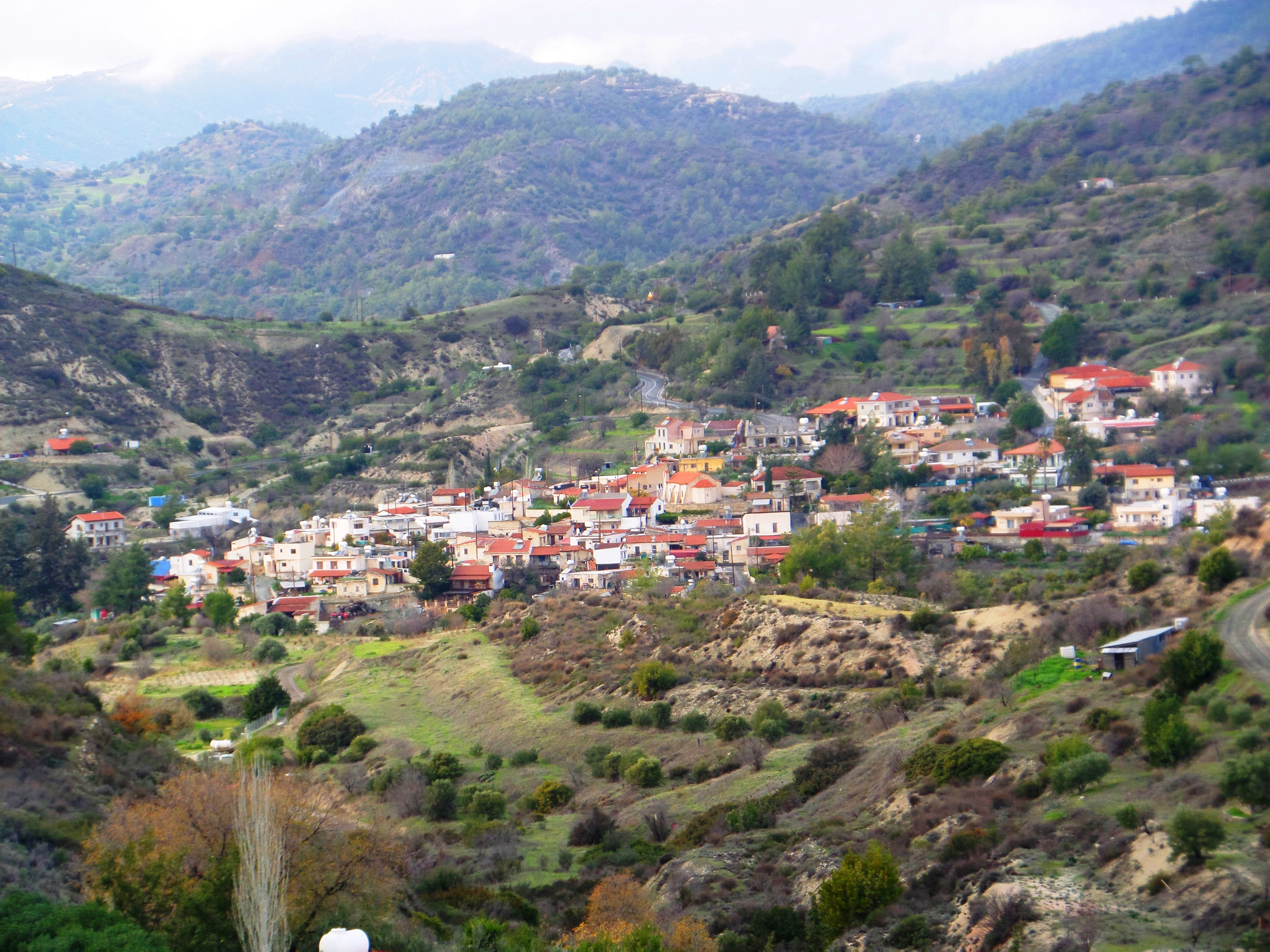

- Location in Cyprus
- Coordinates: 34°47′51″N 33°1′1″E
- Country: Cyprus
- District: Limassol District

Population (2001)
  - Total: 191
- Time zone: UTC+2 (EET)
  - Summer (DST): UTC+3 (EEST)
- Website: http://www.apsiou.org/

Apsiou (Greek: Αψιού) is a village in the Limassol District of Cyprus, located 2 km east of Gerasa and 20 km from the city of Limassol.

== History ==
According to French historian Louis de Mas Latrie, Apsiou was one of the villages belonging to the Grand Commandery. There are also references to the village's church of Panagia, which was built in 1740, as well as to the Monastery of Panagia Amirous, which falls within the community’s administrative boundaries.

== Economy ==
=== Mining ===
The area of Apsiou once contained several mines and quarries, all of which are no longer in operation. There was a pyrite mine (1934–1954) and a chalcopyrite mine. The village also had a soil quarry used for the production of tiles and bricks, as well as another soil quarry for the manufacture of plates and pottery.
