= Maratheftiko =

Variety of grape

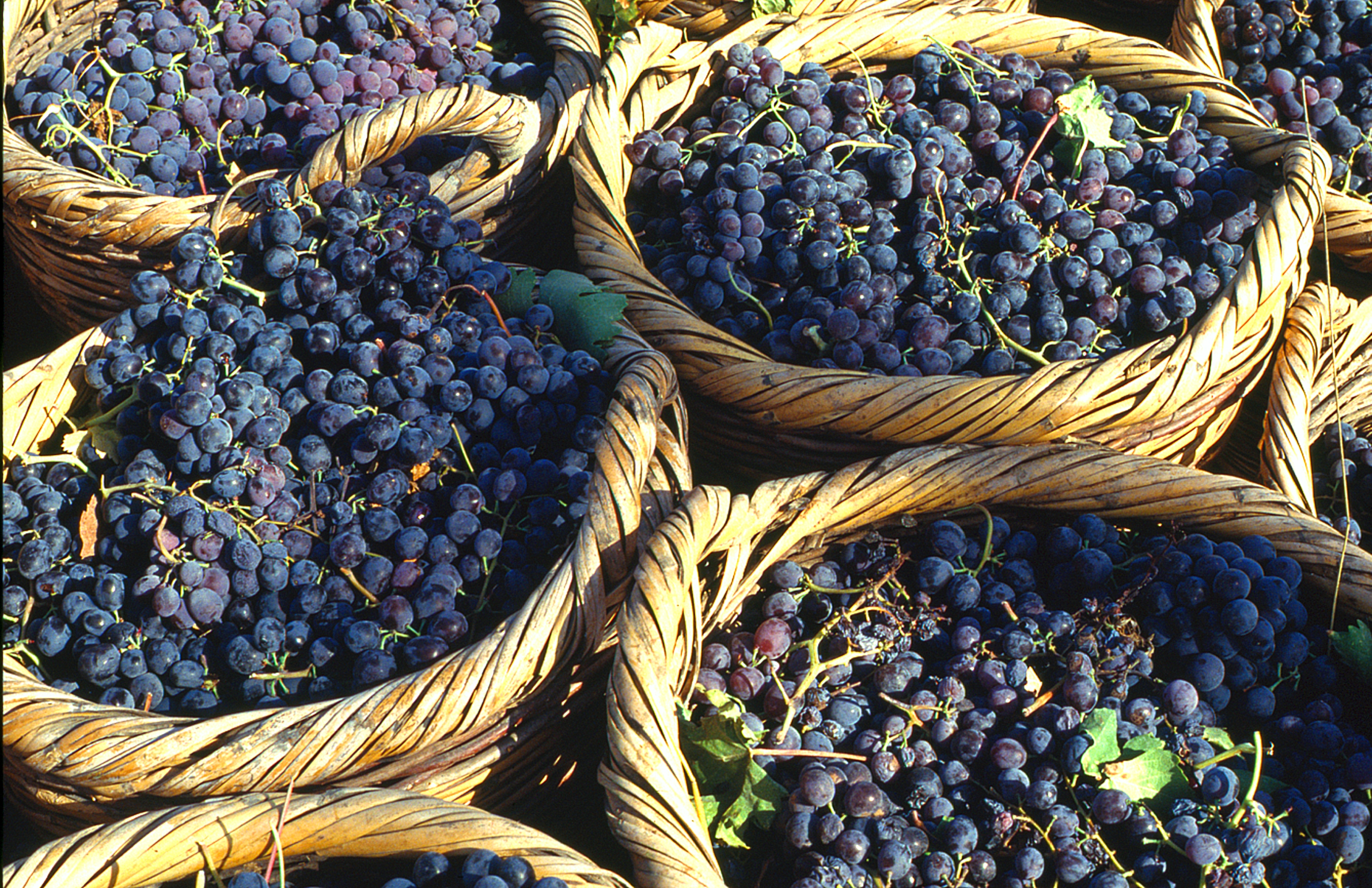

Maratheftiko is an ancient grape variety indigenous to Cyprus. It is also known locally as Vambakadha (Βαμβακάδα), Vambakina (Βαμβακίνα), Pampakia (Παμπακιά), Mavrospourtiko (Μαυροσπούρτικο), Aloupostaphylo (Αλουποστάφυλο). It is grown in sparse quantities around the island but mostly in the Pitsilia region. In the 1980s, with the revival of small boutique wineries in Cyprus this variety was rediscovered and its cultivation is slowly on the increase again, as it offers a distinctive character to local wines. Keo, the largest winery on the island has been one of the companies to encourage its growth. Maratheftiko does not have hermaphrodite flowers like many cultivated grape varieties and requires co-planting with other varieties in order to achieve fertilisation and fruit development. As a result of poor fertilisation, bunches are often greatly affected by millerandage.

2004 statistics reveal that Maratheftiko cultivation covers 125 hectares which represents less than 1% of cultivated vineyards on the island.
