= Laneia =

Laneia Λάνια
- Village
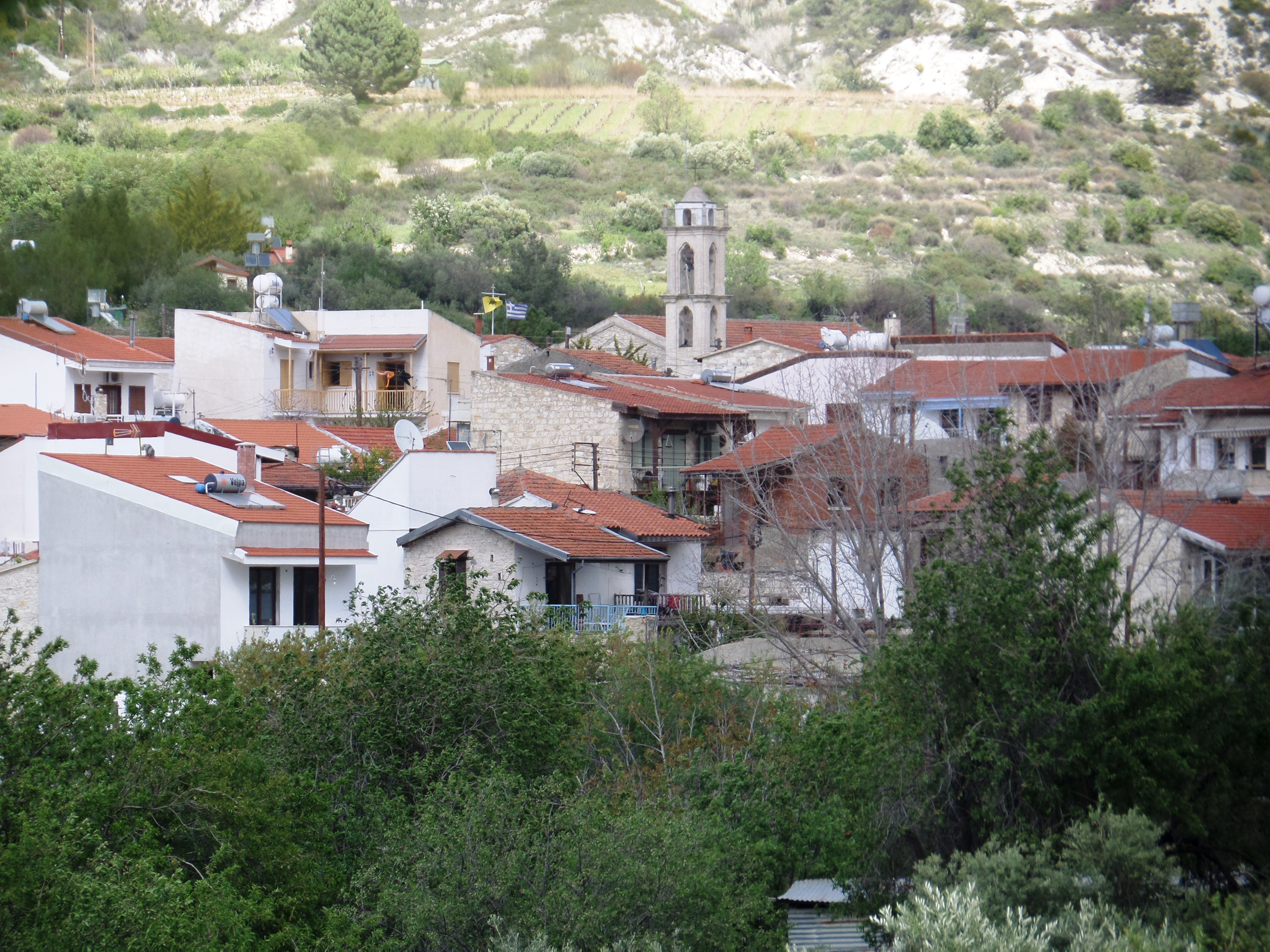

- Location in Cyprus
- Coordinates: 34°49′28″N 32°55′15″E
- Country: Cyprus
- District: Limassol District
- Elevation: 1,886 ft (575 m)

Population (2011)
  - Total: 281
- Time zone: UTC+2 (EET)
  - Summer (DST): UTC+3 (EEST)

Laneia (also spelt Lania; Greek: Λάνεια or Λάνια; Turkish: Lanya) is a village at the foot of Mount Troodos on the main Limassol to Troodos road, about 26 km from Limassol in the country of Cyprus. Lania is one of the country's main wine producing villages.

According to tradition, Lania got its name from Lana, daughter of the Greek god of wine and pleasure, Dionysos. This indicates the deep roots of the village in the field of vine-growing and wine-making. The village is well known for the high quality of its grapes and wines.

== Legend ==
At the time Henry I was King of France, the country’s vineyards from which champagne was produced were destroyed by disease. The King went in search of healthy plants, which he found in the house of Rousos of Laneia. The healthy vines were loaded on a ship, transported to France and used to replant the Champagne vineyards.

== Today ==
The inhabitants of the village are occupied with growing and the production of wine-related products including Zivania, Commandaria and Soutzoukos. Amongst the flower-lined streets and traditional architecture lies the village church, dedicated to St. Mary. The Icon of Saint Mary of Valanas, one of the oldest paintings in the world, is displayed in the church.

In Lania one can find an ancient and authentic Linos, a wine press, formerly used in the production of Commandaria. The entrance to the village is dominated by the old fountain from which villagers would get their drinking water and still today brings back memories of bygone times.
