= Agios Theodoros, Limassol =

Agios Theodoros Αγίος Θεοδώρος
- Village
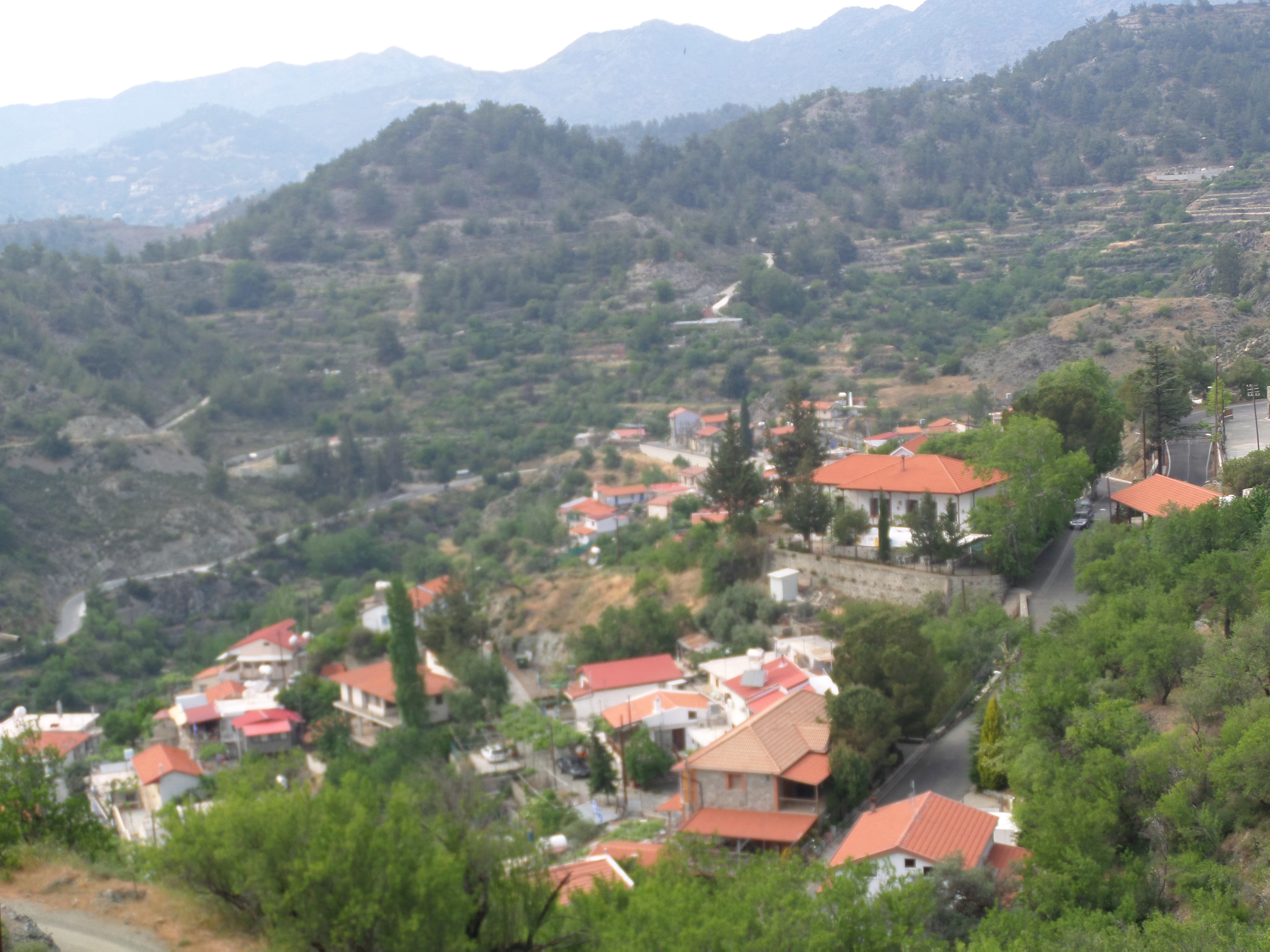

- Location in Cyprus
- Coordinates: 34°53′38″N 33°1′57″E
- Country: Cyprus
- District: Limassol District

Population (2001)
  - Total: 106
- Time zone: UTC+2 (EET)
  - Summer (DST): UTC+3 (EEST)

Agios Theodoros (Greek: Αγίος Θεοδώρος) is a village in the Limassol District of Cyprus, near the town of Palaichori Morphou.
