= Agios Mamas, Limassol =

Agios Mamas Άγιος Μάμας
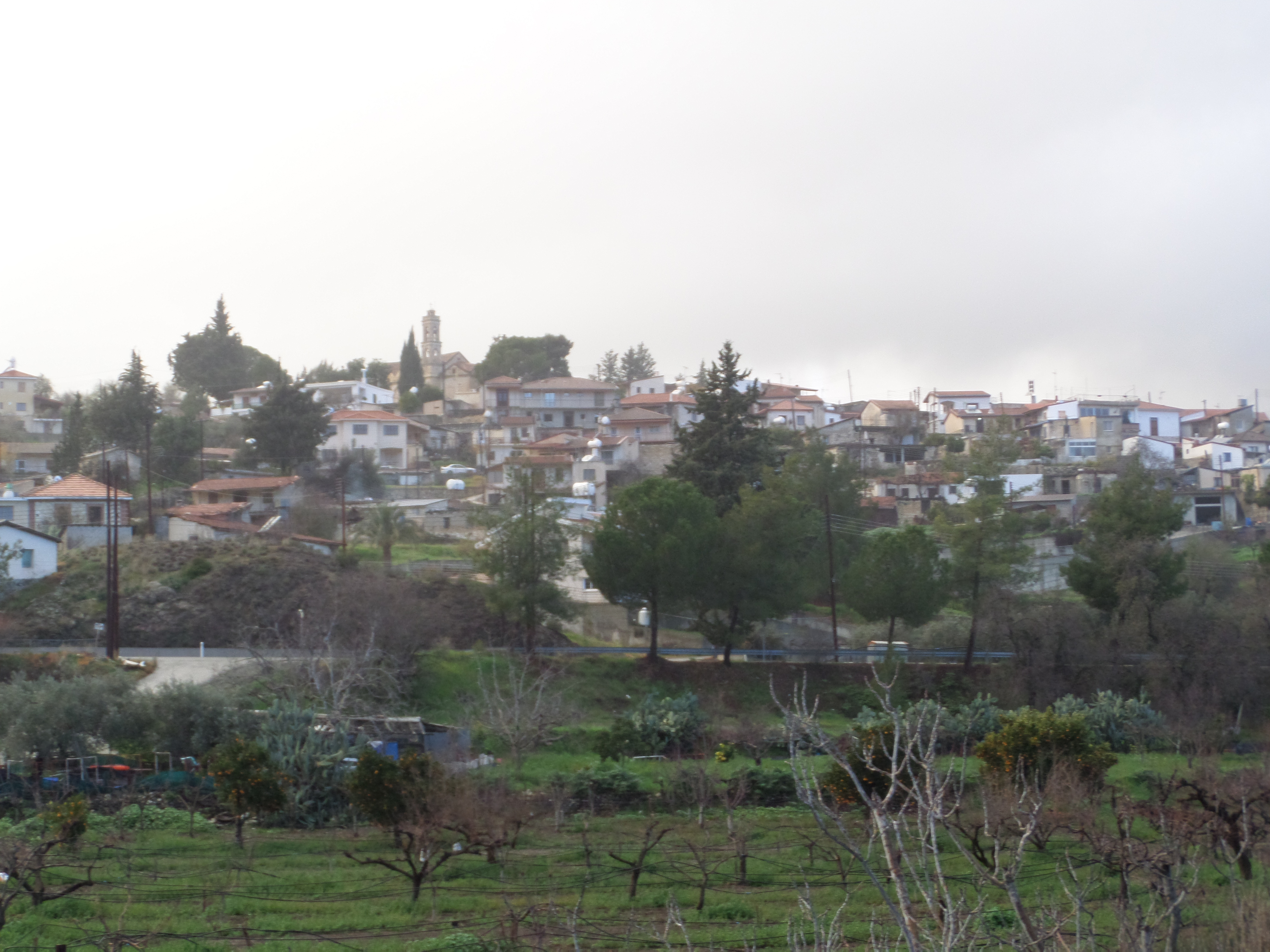
- Agios Mamas village

- Location of Agios Mamas in Cyprus
- Coordinates: 34°51′1″N 32°56′53″E
- Country: Cyprus
- District: Limassol
- Elevation: 590 m (1,940 ft)

Population (2001)
  - Total: 105
- Postal code: 4741

Agios Mamas (Greek: Άγιος Μάμας) is a small village in the Limassol region of Cyprus. It is located on the southern slopes of the Troodos mountain range in the area famous for its Commandaria wine.

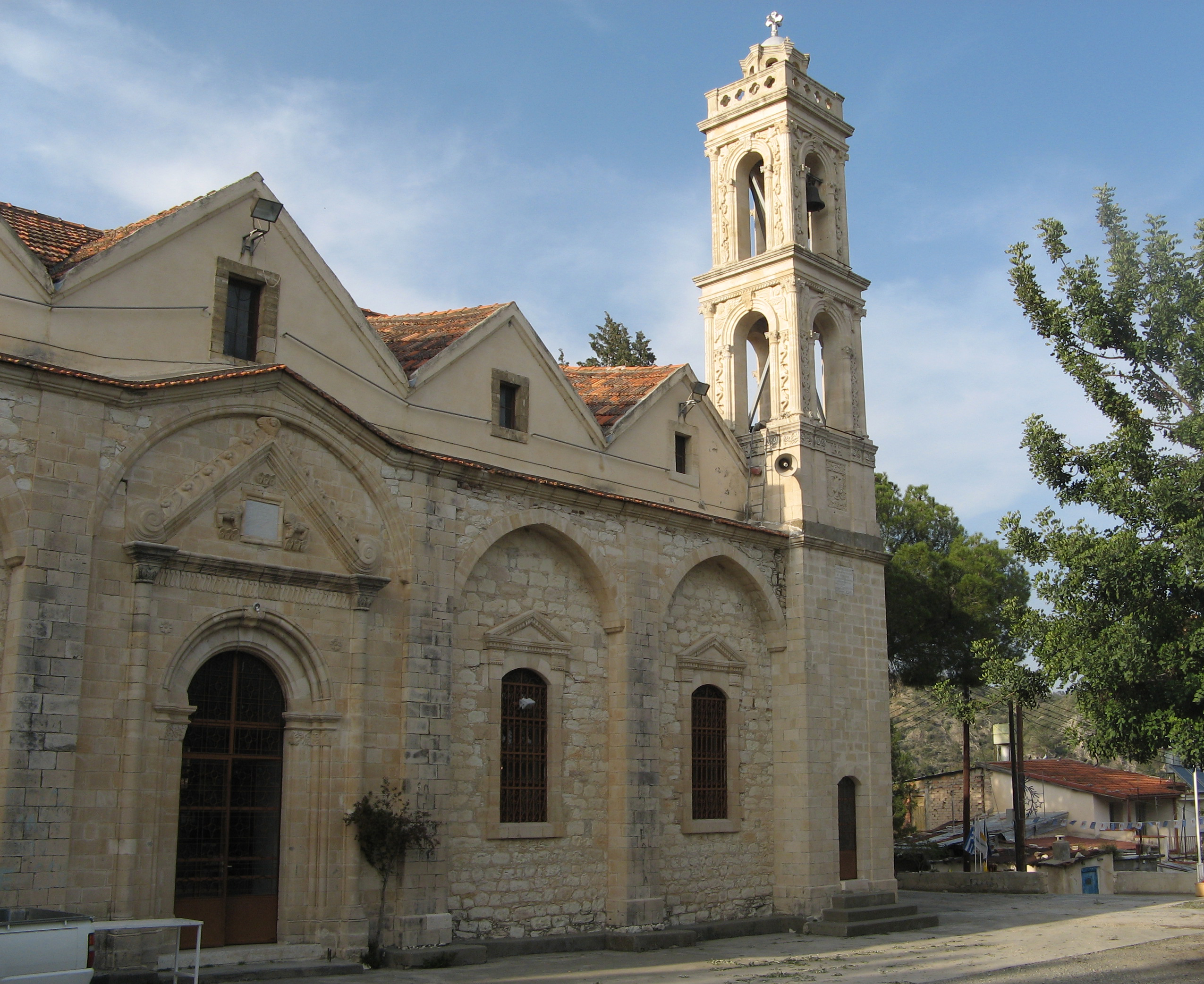
Agios Mamas village church

The village is built in an amphitheatric layout under Mount Zalaka. It is named after Saint Mamas, a 3rd-century Christian martyr and the main village church, built on the hill above the main settlement, is dedicated to the saint. A second small church on the southern outskirts of the village is dedicated to Saint Paraskevi and its interior is covered with wall paintings. The village also has a cultural centre with a small library next to the church and a shop with a post office and a bank in the centre of the village.

Local inhabitants are mainly involved in viticulture as well as a growing olives, almonds and other fruit trees.
