= Gerasa, Cyprus =

Gerasa Γεράσα
- Village
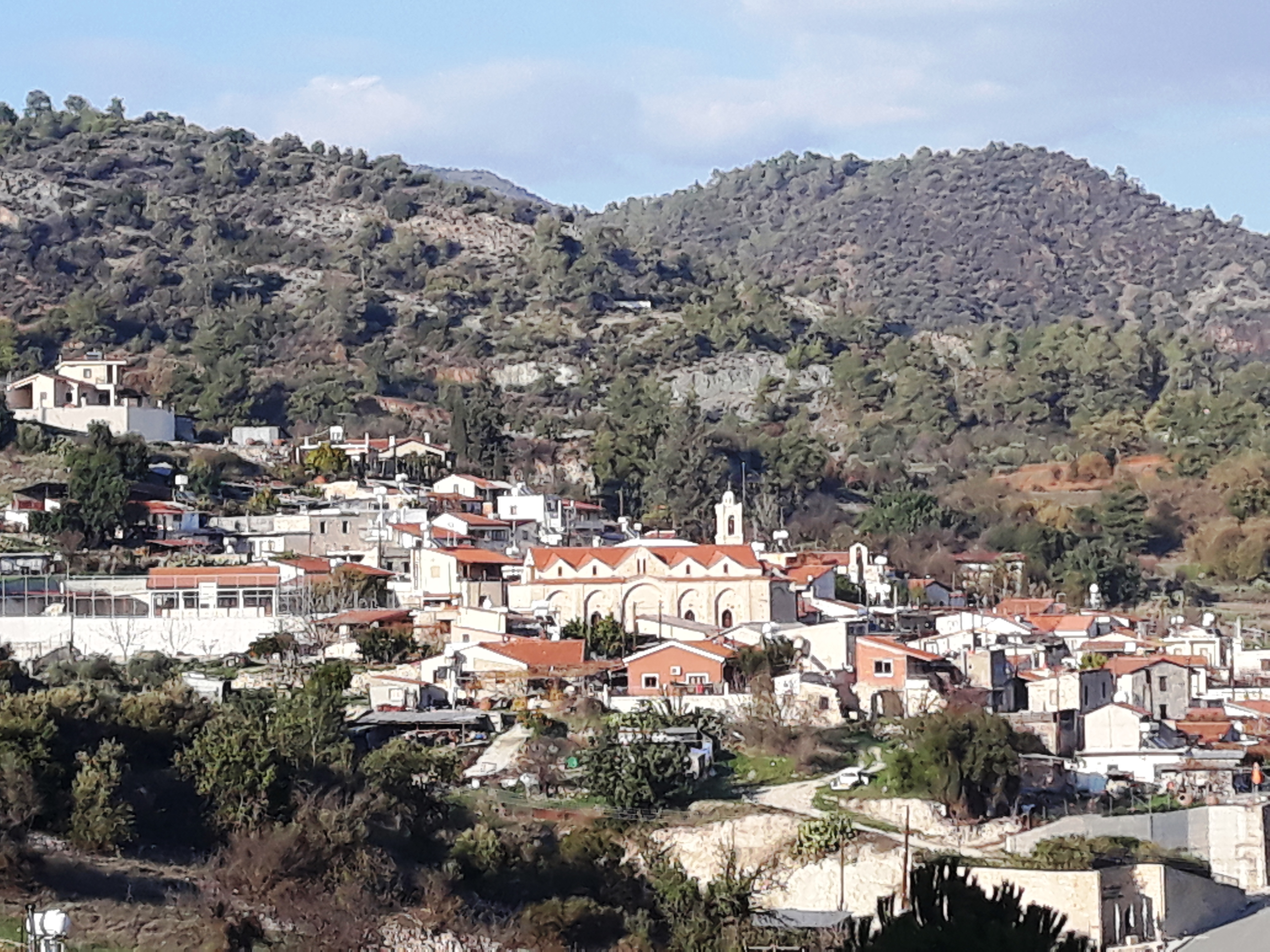

- Location in Cyprus
- Coordinates: 34°48′9″N 32°59′53″E
- Country: Cyprus
- District: Limassol District

Population (2001)
  - Total: 80
- Time zone: UTC+2 (EET)
  - Summer (DST): UTC+3 (EEST)

Gerasa (Greek: Γεράσα) is a village in the Limassol District of Cyprus, located 5 km north of Paramytha.

== History ==
Gerasa was one of the villages belonging to the Great Commandery, whose administrative center was at Kolossi.

== Religion ==
The village has three churches. Two of them are dedicated to Saint George, one of which serves as the main church of the community where regular services are held. The third church, essentially a small chapel, is dedicated to Archangel Michael.

== Bibliography ==
Καρούζης, Γιώργος (2001). Περιδιαβάζοντας την Κύπρο: Λεμεσός (πόλη και επαρχία) [Exploring Cyprus: Limassol (city and district)] (πρώτη ed.). Λευκωσία: ΣΕΛΑΣ Κεντρο Μελετων Ερευνων & Εκδοσεων. p. 169-170. ISBN 9963-566-67-7.
