= Kalo Chorio, Limassol =

Coordinates: 34°51′0″N 33°01′55″E

Kalo Chorio Καλό Χωριό
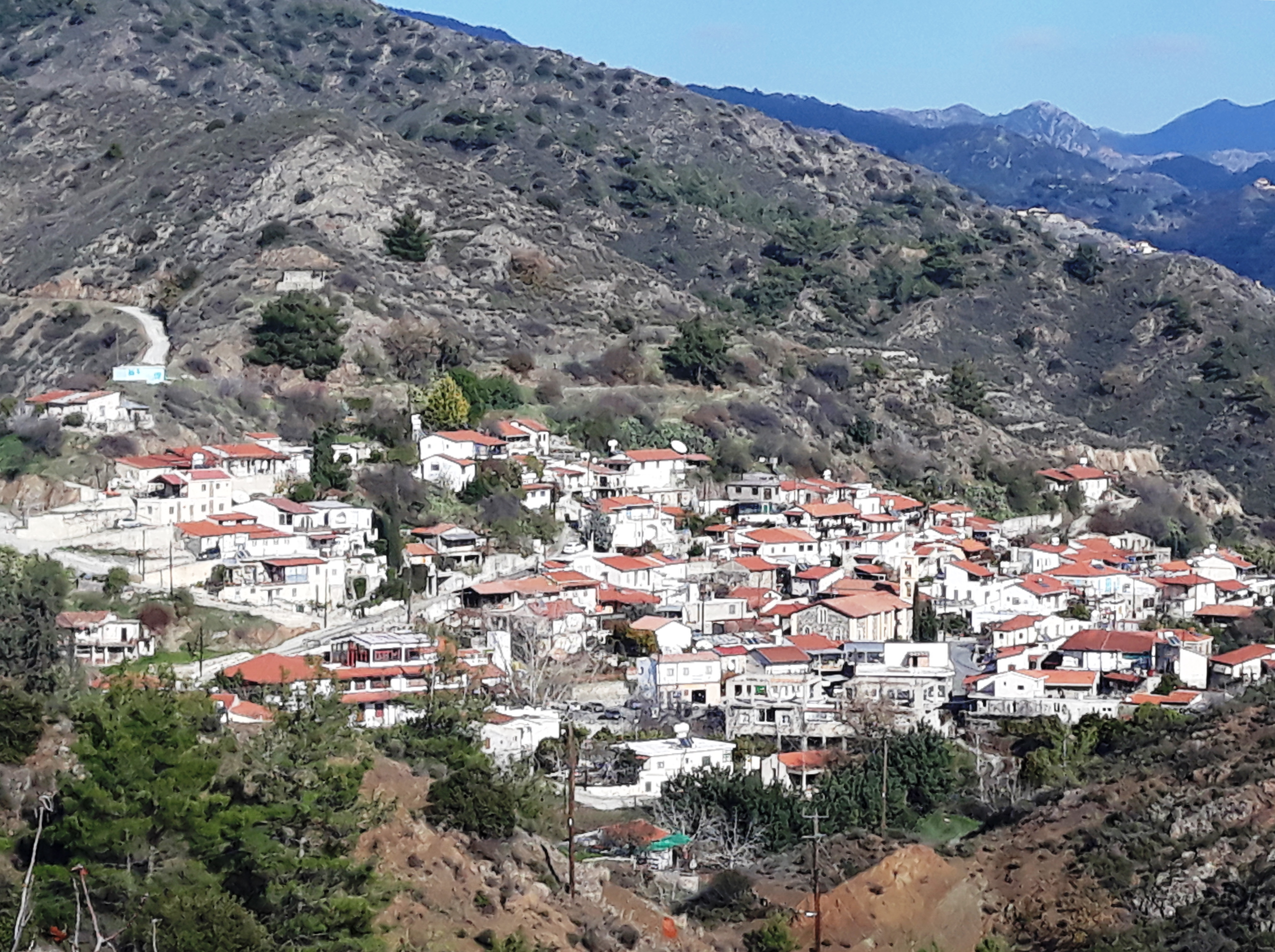
- Interactive map of Kalo Chorio
- Country: Cyprus
- District: Limassol District

Population (2001)
  - Total: 472
- Time zone: UTC+2 (EET)
  - Summer (DST): UTC+3 (EEST)

Kalo Chorio (Greek: Καλό Χωριό Λεμεσού, literally Good Village) is a village located 21 kilometres (13 mi) north of Limassol in Cyprus. It is best known for its production of Commandaria wine. The name translates (from Greek) word for word as good village.
