= Mavro =

Variety of grape

Mavro (μαύρο)
- Grape (Vitis)
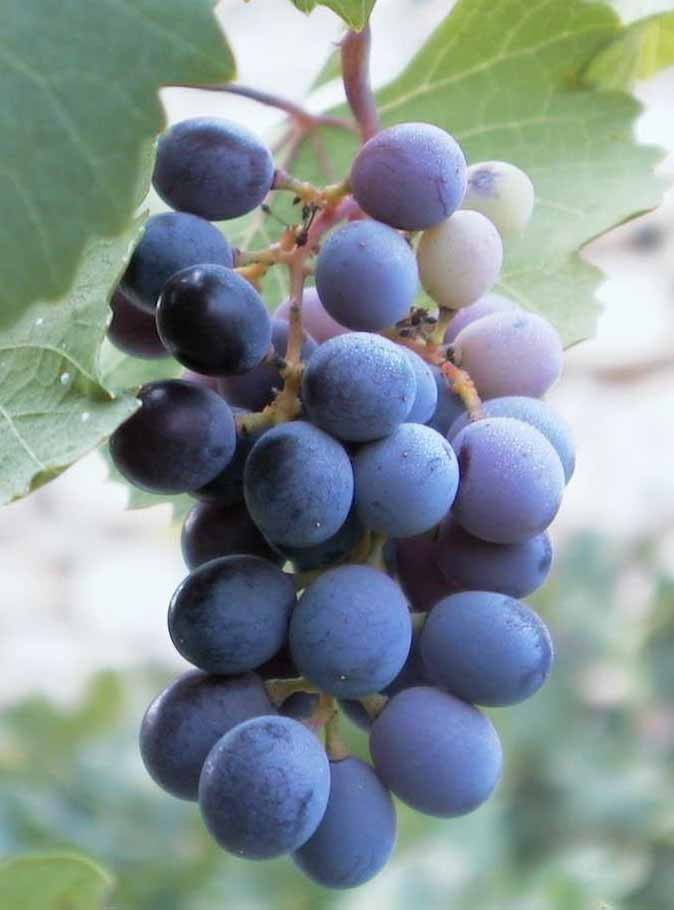
- Mavro grapes
- Species: Vitis vinifera
- Origin: Cyprus
- Notable wines: Commandaria
- VIVC number: 3305

Mavro (Greek: μαύρο, meaning "black") is an indigenous red grape cultivated on the island of Cyprus. The grape takes its name from its dark colour. The Italian ampelographer, Count Giuseppe di Rovasenda refers to it in 1877 as Cipro Nero (Cyprus black). An ancient variety, its suitability to the hot Cypriot climate has made it the dominant cultivated vine on the island. It accounts for 70% of cultivated vines. Of note is that Mavro continues to grow on ancient rootstock unlike most mainland European grapes that are grafted on North American rootstock. This is a consequence of Cyprus’ escape from the phylloxera epidemic that had devastated most other European vineyards, in the 19th century.

Mavrud is a Bulgarian wine with a similar name made from mavrud grapes. Recent genotyping has shown that these two varieties (Mavro and Mavrud) are not related.

Mavro grapes are used in the production of several (predominantly red) local wines. Most notably however, Mavro is blended with the Xynisteri grape for the production of Commandaria, a well-known Cypriot dessert wine. It is also used in the production of the spirit zivania. Harvesting usually takes place in September.
