= Pitsilia =

Agricultural region in Cyprus

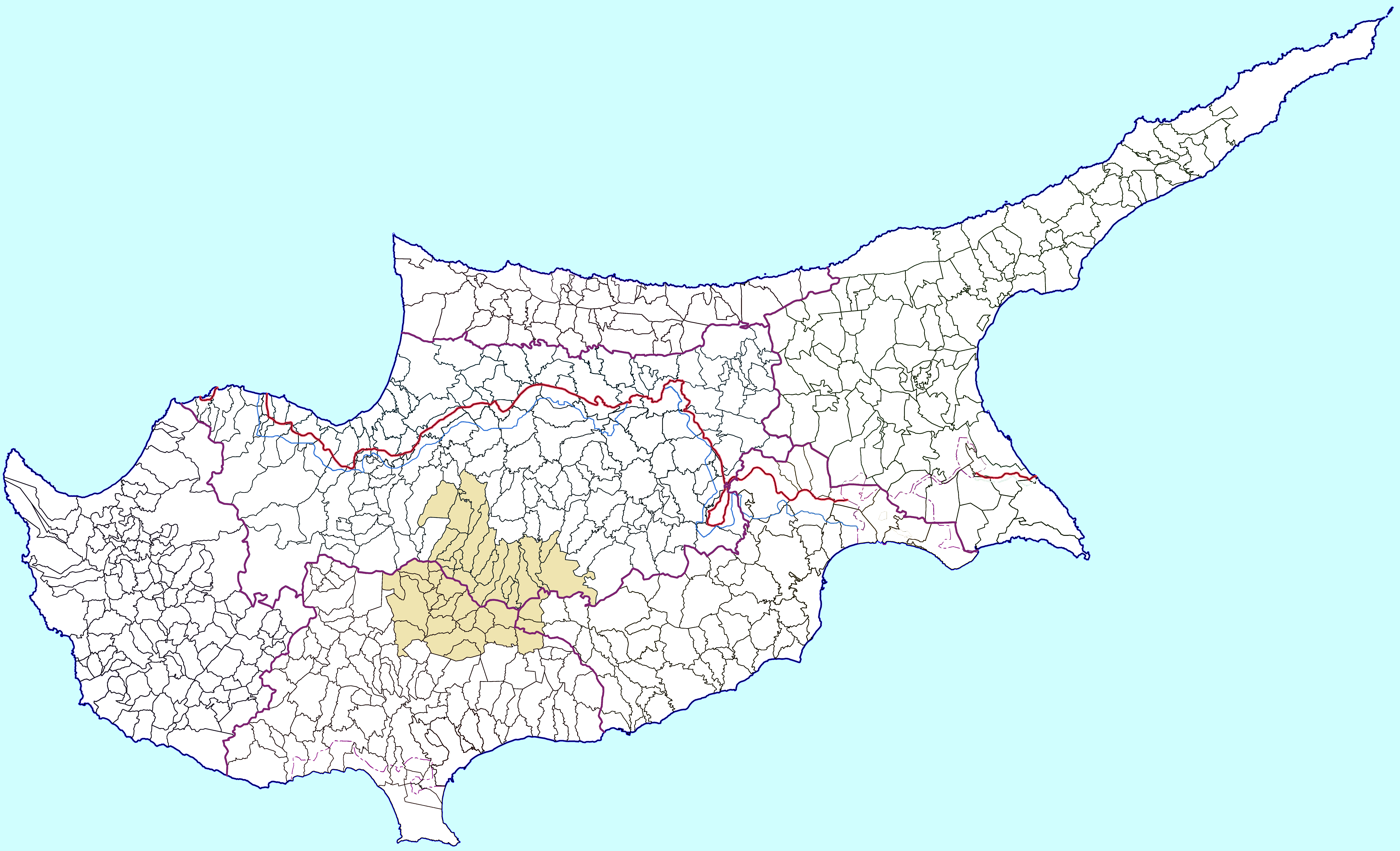
Map of Cyrprus with Pitsilia highlighted in green

Pitsilia (Greek: Πιτσιλιά) is an agricultural region in Cyprus, with total area of 61,000 hectares (150,000 acres), in a mountainous area of rocky land on very steep slopes that have been used mainly for grazing goats and sheep and for producing small amounts of cereals, wine and grapes. The region complemented by eastern, north and south eastern part of the Troodos Mountains at elevations between 500 and 1,600 metres (1,600 and 5,200 ft) and includes villages from the districts of Limassol and Nicosia.

The region includes four of the biggest Church of Cyprus, which is registered in the list of World Heritage Sites by UNESCO. This is the church of the Transfiguration in the village Palaichori Oreinis the Cross of Agiasmati in Platanistasa, the Holy Cross in Pelentri and Lady Araka in Lagoudera.

== History ==
Towards the end of the 4th century, Christianity was adopted as the obligatory religion in Roman Empire. In Cyprus some groups exploited these events for personal benefits or revenge and started to use violence against those who did not agree to endorse Christianity. For this reason a large portion of the population, avoiding oppression were forced to resettle in the highlands of Pitsilias.

Epiphanius of Salamis, in order to appease and limit the unacceptable behaviour of this groups, sought support of Emperor Theodosius and with a decree established this mountainous region as a security zone for non-Christians, known back then as the "infidelity area" ("Apistilia" in Greek: η περιοχή των απίστων). The name also served as propaganda at the beginning of the transition to Christianity. Since "Apistlia" was an offensive word, the name changed over time to the antonym Pitsilias.

In 653 AD due to the Arab invasion, the area of Pitsilias became the bastion of resistance, its population strengthened by refugees and retreating soldiers. Mainly because of the small number (10000 Army), and after a few unsuccessful attempts, Rashidun Caliphate drafted a peace treaty with local leaders of Pitsilias avoiding the ravages of guerrilla warfare.

In 704AD a peace treaty between Umayyad Caliphate and Tiberios III was broken. Tiberios facilitated the repatriation of thousands of Cypriot war prisoners from Cyzicus Propontis. A large number of them settled in the region bringing the relics of the Holy Icons. Their freedom and repatriation was credited by them as a miracle through the Holy Icons' intercessions. After a few years another "miracle" occurred – a general amnesty pardon for all fugitives, outlaws and militants in the area. The fame of the miracle of the Holy Icons spread all over Cyprus and overseas. These facts led to the establishment of feasts and festivals to commemorate the Holy Icons. The thousands of pilgrims contributed to the economic growth of the region, an economic growth and stability that lasted over a period of four centuries. The history of Pitsilia and the linkage between the past and the present is an example of the survival of Hellenic culture in Cyprus. The festivals of Pitsilia have a special feature, combining the Christian and ancient Greek joyful celebrations. The song and music contest resembles the myth of Marsyas and Apollo.

== See also ==
- Cyprus in the Middle Ages
