= Xynisteri =

Variety of grape

- Grape (Vitis)
- Origin: Cyprus
- Notable regions: Troodos mountain range
- Notable wines: Commandaria, Xynisteri
- VIVC number: 704

Xynisteri (also spelled xinisteri; Greek: ξυνιστέρι) is an indigenous white grape grown on Cyprus.

According to some estimates, 33% of Cypriot vineyards, on the south slopes of the Troodos mountain range are planted with this grape variety, a fact that makes Xynisteri the main white grape grown of Cyprus.

Its clusters and berries are of medium size while it is known for its durability against wine diseases. It is used in the production of several local (mainly white) wines. Xynisteri is blended with Mavro grapes for the production of the Commandaria, a well-known Cypriot dessert wine and it is also used for the production of the local spirit Zivania.

The grape variety is being trialled in the hotter wine regions in Australia like the Barossa and the Riverland where it is reducing growers' water consumption by 75% and withstanding heatwave events above 45 degrees Celsius due to a root structure three to four times the size of other European varieties.
