= Kolossi =

Kolossi: Κολόσσι (Greek); Yunus (Turkish)
- Village and municipal district
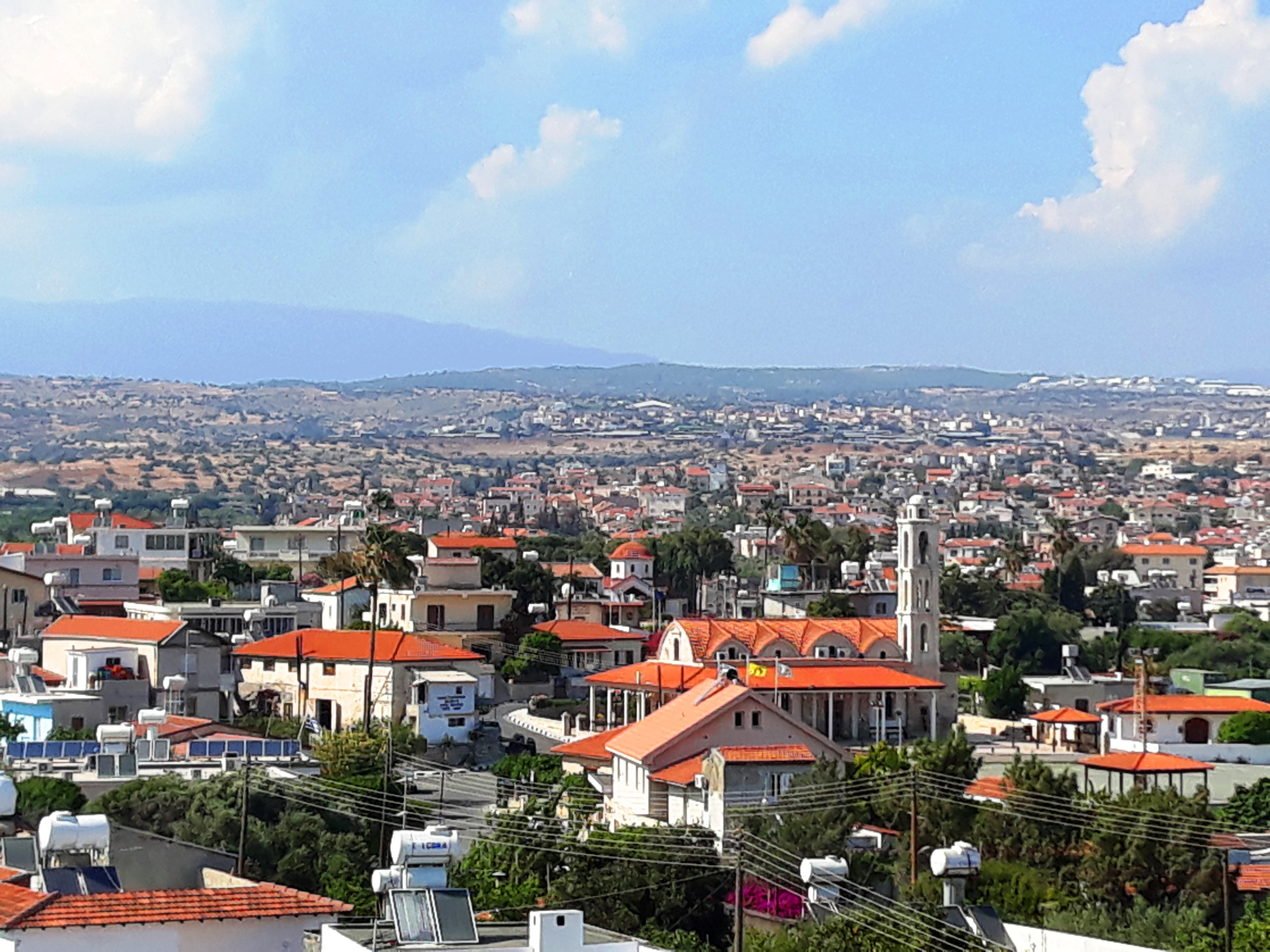
- View of Kolossi from Kolossi Castle
- Interactive map of Kolossi
- Location within Cyprus Location within the Eastern Mediterranean Location within the European Union Location within Asia
- Coordinates: 34°40′14″N 32°56′01″E
- Country: Cyprus
- District: Limassol District
- Municipality: Kourion Municipality
- Incorporated into Kourion Municipality: 1 July 2024

Government
  - Body: Municipal Council of Kourion
  - Deputy mayor: Loukas Genethliou
- Elevation: 45 m (148 ft)

Population (2021)
  - Total: 6,482
- Time zone: UTC+2 (EET)
  - Summer (DST): UTC+3 (EEST)
- Postal code: 4632
- Website: kourion.org

Kolossi (Greek: Κολόσσι [locally [koˈlosːi]]; Turkish: Yunus) is a village and municipal district of the Kourion Municipality on the outskirts of Limassol, Cyprus. It lies partly in the Sovereign Base Areas of Akrotiri and Dhekelia. Its population in 2021 was 6,482.

Prior to the 2024 local government reform, Kolossi was a separate community; it was incorporated into Kourion Municipality on 1 July 2024.

== Location ==
Kolossi is located 11 kilometres from Limassol. It is built at an elevation of 45 metres above sea level. It borders Erimi and Episkopi to the west, Akrotiri to the south, Trachoni to the east, and Ypsonas to the north and northeast. Part of Kolossi's administrative area falls within the territory of the British Sovereign Base Areas of Akrotiri and Dhekelia.

== History ==
In 1192, Richard the Lionheart, king of England, sold Cyprus to Guy of Lusignan, a French nobleman and the deposed monarch of the Crusader Kingdom of Jerusalem. The new ruler brought with him many knights, nobles, and military orders, granting them extensive lands and privileges. In this way, he established the feudal system and safeguarded his control over the island from both internal and external threats. One of these fiefs was the fief of Kolossi, which comprised around 60 villages. Its territory extended from the fertile plain at the mouth of the Kouris River to the villages of Vouni and Koilani. The fief of Kolossi was granted to the French noble Garinus de Colos, from whom the village took its name.

In 1210, King Hugh I of Cyprus purchased the fief and transferred it to the Knights Hospitaller. This order built the first, smaller fortress at Kolossi, which became the center of their military administration (the Grand Commandery). In the early 13th century, the settlement that would become the village of Kolossi also began to form.

In 1427, the fortress was destroyed during raids by the Egyptian Mamluk Sultanate. In 1454, under the command of Knight Hospitaller Louis de Magnac, the present-day medieval Kolossi Castle was constructed on the ruins of the earlier structure.

== Kolossi Castle ==
Kolossi Castle is a former Crusader stronghold located on the south-west edge of Kolossi. It housed extensive facilities for processing sugar from locally grown sugarcane, one of the island's principal exports at the time. The original castle was likely built in 1210 by the Frankish military, when King Hugh I granted Kolossi to the Knights Hospitaller; the present structure, however, was erected in 1454 under the command of Louis de Magnac, whose coat of arms remains carved into its walls. Amid political rivalries within the Crusader Kingdom of Cyprus, the Templars seized the castle in 1306, but it was returned to the Hospitallers in 1313 after the dissolution of the Templar Order.

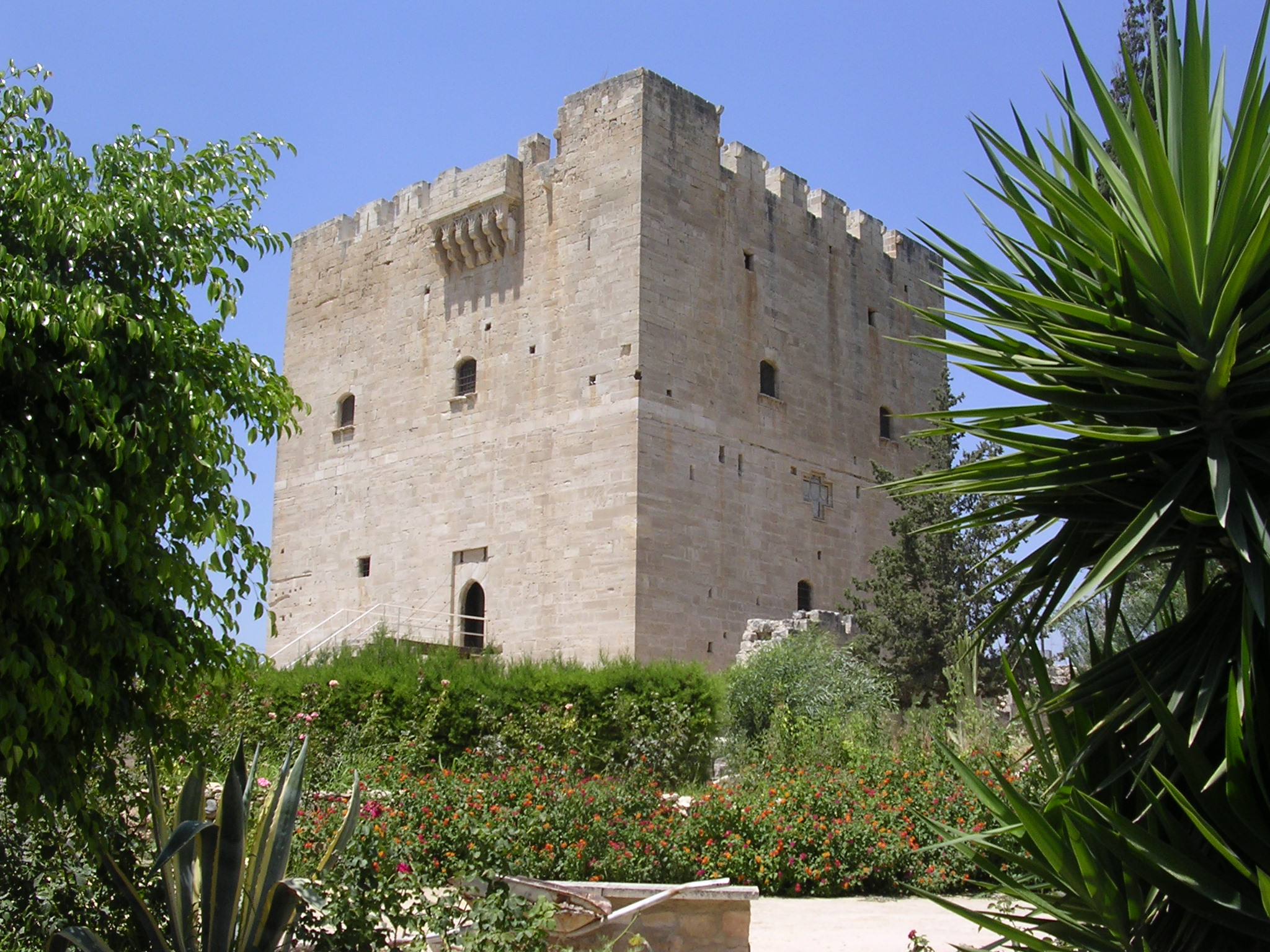
Kolossi Castle in 2004

Today, the castle consists of a three-storey square keep, 21 metres tall and 17 by 17 metres in size, accompanied by a rectangular bailey measuring approximately 30 by 40 metres. The surrounding region is also famous for the sweet wine Commandaria, celebrated since antiquity and reputedly praised by Richard the Lionheart as the "wine of kings and king of wines", and considered the world's oldest continuously produced and named wine, deriving its name from the Templars' Grand Commandery at Kolossi.
