= Sotira =

Sotira (Greek: Σωτήρα, lit. 'savior') may refer to several places in Greece and Cyprus:

- Sotira, Pella, Greece
- Sotira, Trikala, Greece
- Sotira, Famagusta, Cyprus
- Sotira, Limassol, Cyprus
- Sotira, an Ottoman settlement at the location of modern Karditsa, Greece
- Sotira (beetle), a genus of beetles in the tribe Hesperophanini
