= Kourion Municipality =

Municipality in Limassol District

Kourion Municipality: Δήμος Κουρίου (Greek); Kurion Belediyesi (Turkish)
- Municipality
- Municipality of Kourion
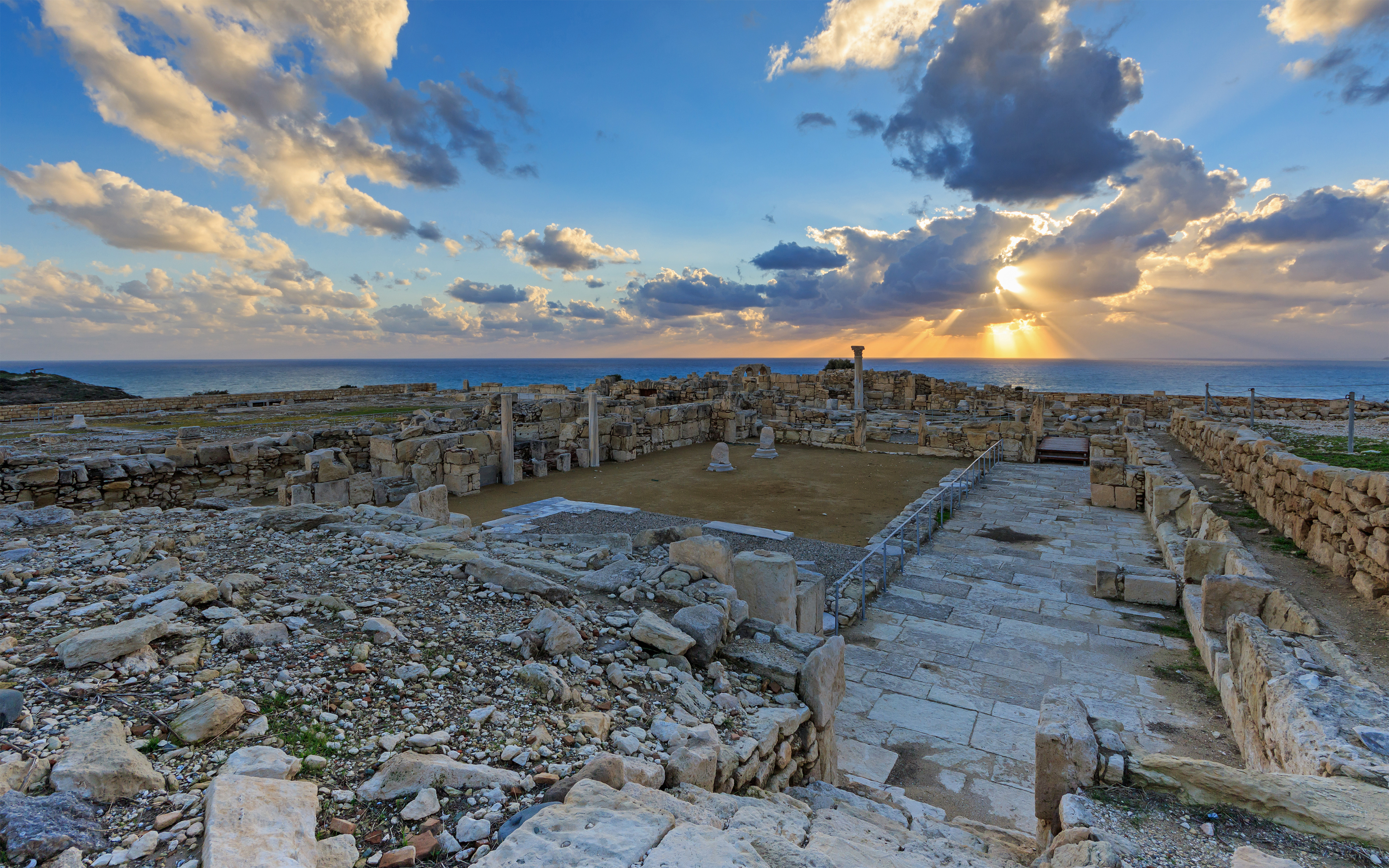
- Ancient Kourion, after which the municipality is named
- Country: Cyprus
- District: Limassol District
- Established: 1 July 2024
- Named for: Kourion
- Municipal seat: Ypsonas
- Municipal districts: List: Ypsonas; Trachoni; Episkopi; Kolossi; Erimi; Asomatos; Akrotiri; Kantou; Sotira

Government
  - Type: Municipal council
  - Body: Municipal Council of Kourion
  - Mayor: Pantelis E. Georgiou

Population (2025)
  - Total: 35,000
- Approximate population
- Time zone: UTC+2 (EET)
  - Summer (DST): UTC+3 (EEST)
- Postal code: 4182
- Telephone code: +357 25
- Address: Makariou III 120, 4182 Ypsonas
- Telephone: 25395600
- Fax: 25392595
- Email: ...
- Website: kourion.org

Kourion Municipality (Greek: Δήμος Κουρίου; Turkish: Kurion Belediyesi) is a municipality in Limassol District, Cyprus. It was established on 1 July 2024 as part of Cyprus' local government reform and is named after the ancient city of Kourion.

The municipality is headquartered in the municipal district of Ypsonas, and is composed of nine municipal districts in total: Akrotiri, Asomatos, Episkopi, Erimi, Kantou, Kolossi, Sotira, Trachoni, and Ypsonas.

== Formation ==
Following the implementation of the 2024 local government reforms in Cyprus of the new legislative framework—comprising the Municipalities Law, the Communities Law, and the Law on District Local Government Organisations, which reduced and reorganised the number of municipalities across the island, the new Kourion Municipality was formed. It was formed from the former Ypsonas Municipality, together with the former communities of Akrotiri, Asomatos, Episkopi, Erimi, Kantou, Kolossi, Sotira and Trachoni. These former local authorities now function as municipal districts within Kourion Municipality, each forming part of the wider municipal administration and represented through a deputy mayor and local municipal structures.

== Government ==
Kourion Municipality is governed by the Municipal Council of Kourion. The first mayor of the municipality is Pantelis Eftychiou Georgiou, who previously served as mayor of Ypsonas before the establishment of the new municipality.

The Municipal Council includes the mayor, the deputy mayors of the municipal districts, and elected municipal councillors. The Kourion Municipality has nine deputy mayors, each representing one of the municipal districts within Kourion Municipality.

Municipal district	Deputy mayor (2024–present)
Ypsonas	Aleka Stylianou
Kolossi	Loukas Genethliou
Trachoni	Kyriakos Christodoulou
Episkopi	Lefkios Prodromou
Erimi	Andreas Arestis
Akrotiri	Georgios Konstantinou
Asomatos	Elena Themistokleous
Kantou	Sofoklis Georgiou
Sotira	Nikos Nikolaou

The elected municipal councillors represent the municipal districts of Ypsonas, Kolossi, Trachoni, Episkopi and Erimi. The council is supported by a number of municipal committees, including committees for internal audit, tenders, beaches, culture, education and sport, social welfare, environment and cleanliness, refugee affairs, European affairs, personnel, infrastructure, transport and road safety, and technical matters.

Municipal district	Councillors
Ypsonas	Fanos Permanos; Savvas Agisilaou; Yiannakis Vasiliou; Panagiotis Panayiotou
Kolossi	Olga Konstantinou; Charalambos Charalambous
Trachoni	Michalis Peratikos; Marios Michael
Episkopi	Panagiotis Athini; Maurikios Maurikiou
Erimi	Vasos Kyriakou

== Municipal districts ==
Kourion Municipality is composed of nine municipal districts. Ypsonas serves as the municipal seat and is the largest urban centre of the municipality.

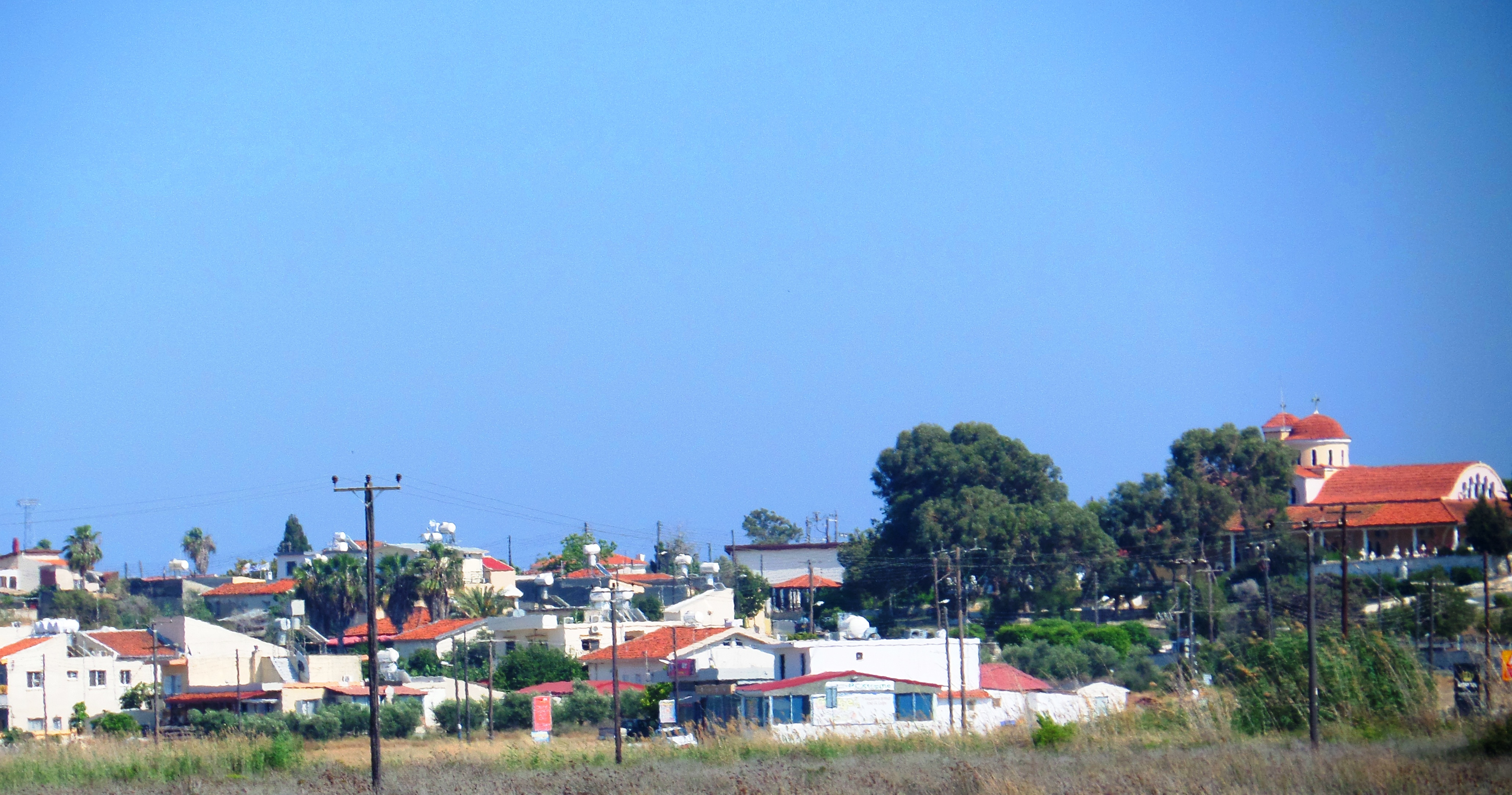
View of the Akrotiri village

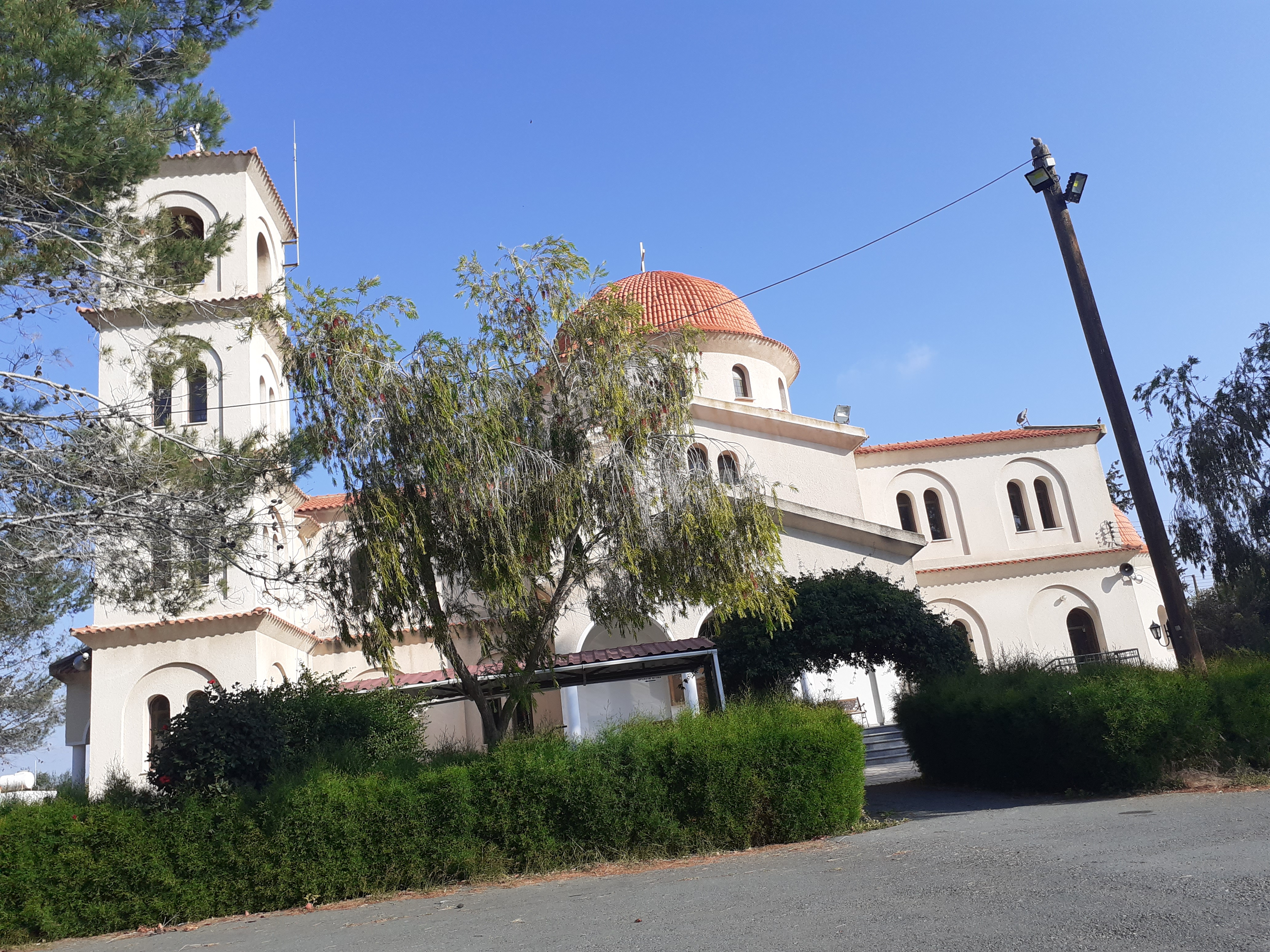
Orthodox Church in Asomatos

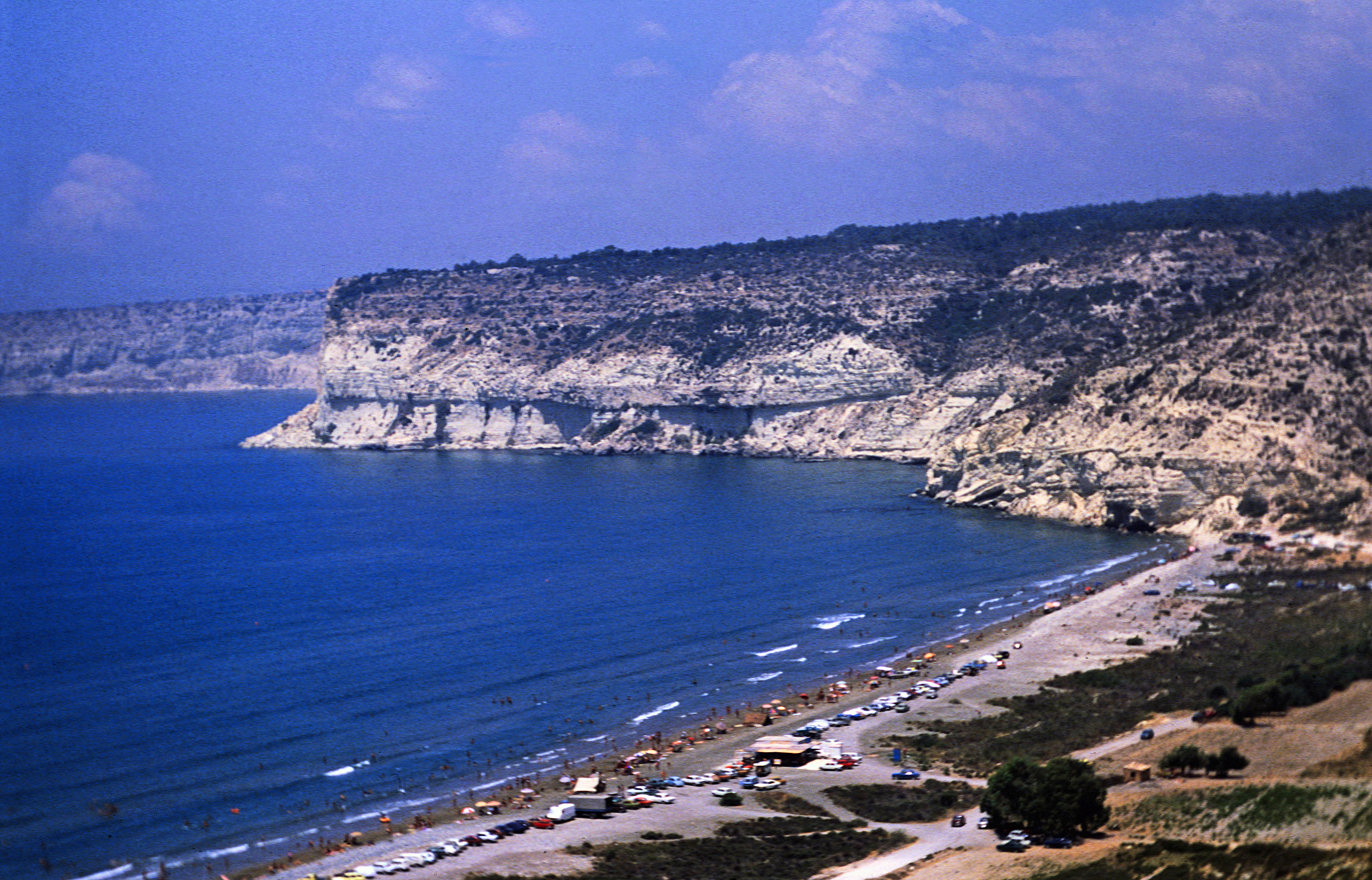
Kourion Episkopi Bay Cliffs

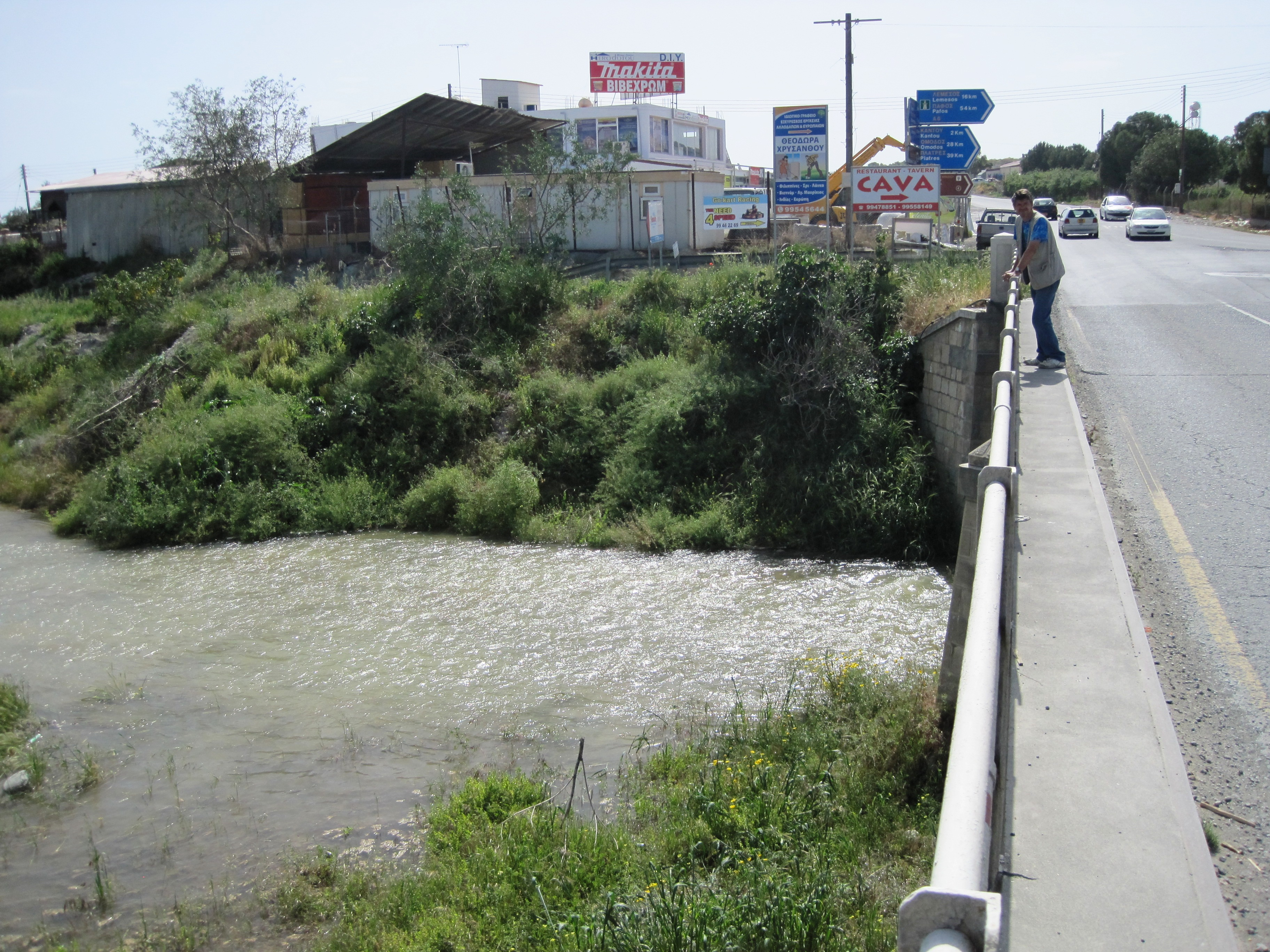
Kouris River in Erimi

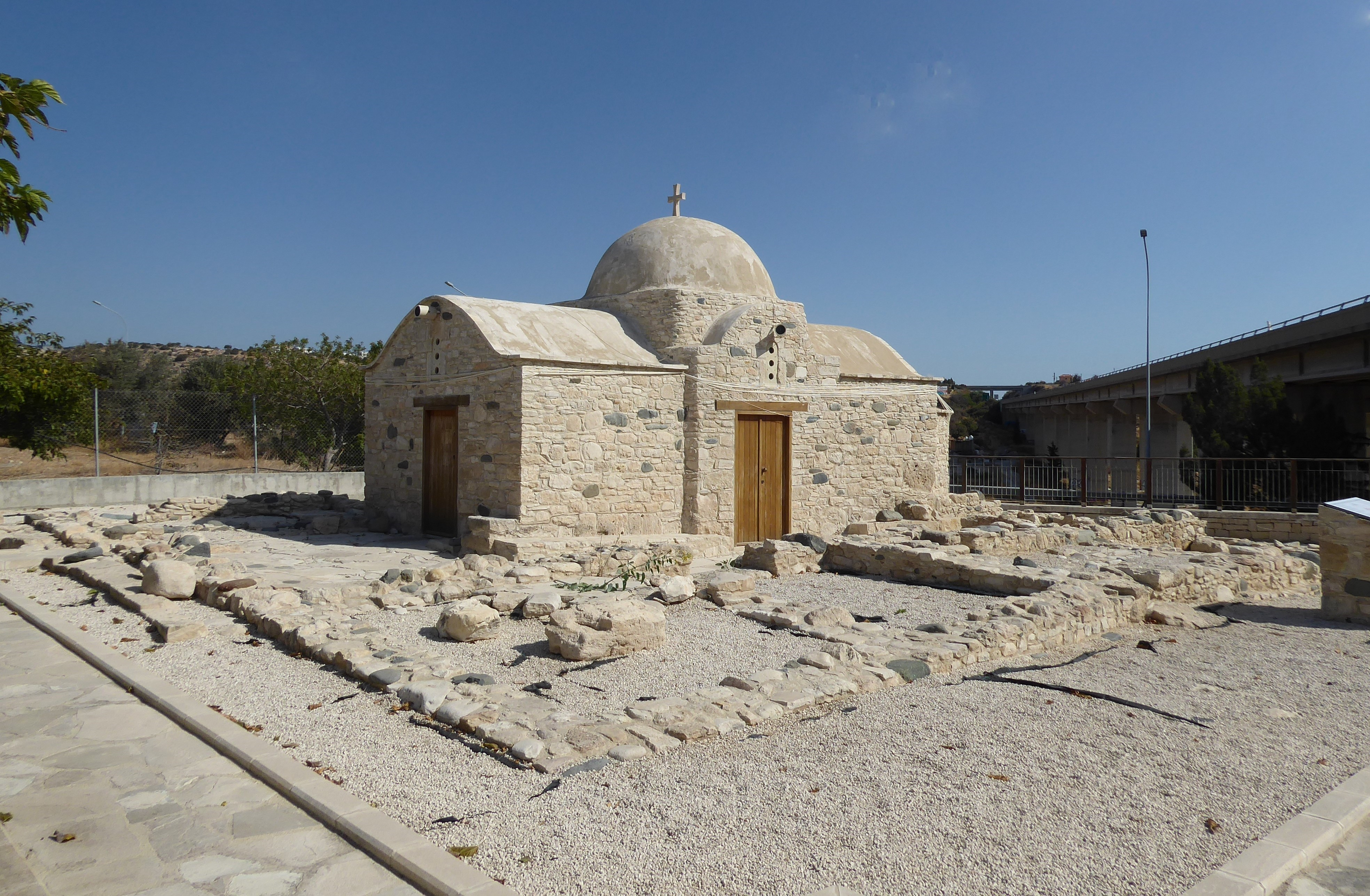
Church of Agia Marina Kantou

=== Akrotiri ===
Akrotiri is a coastal municipal district on the Akrotiri Peninsula. It is associated with the wider Akrotiri area, which includes important environmental sites, such as the Akrotiri Environmental Education Centre, and forms part of the southern coast of the Kourion Municipality. A significant part of the surrounding area lies within the Sovereign Base Area of Akrotiri, one of the Sovereign Base Areas of Akrotiri and Dhekelia administered by the United Kingdom.

=== Asomatos ===
Asomatos is a municipal district located near Akrotiri and the western coastal area of Limassol District. It forms part of the group of former communities that were incorporated into Kourion Municipality during the 2024 local government reform. The wider area is closely connected with the Akrotiri Peninsula, parts of which lie within the Sovereign Base Area of Akrotiri, administered by the United Kingdom as part of Akrotiri and Dhekelia.

=== Episkopi ===
Episkopi is a municipal district closely associated with the ancient city of Kourion, one of the most important archaeological sites in Cyprus. The area links the modern municipality with the historical landscape from which the municipality takes its name and forms part of its coastal zone. Part of the wider Episkopi area lies within the Sovereign Base Area of Akrotiri, administered by the United Kingdom as part of Akrotiri and Dhekelia, and should not be confused with Episkopi Cantonment.

=== Erimi ===
Erimi is an inland municipal district west of Limassol. The area is associated with local agricultural activity, viticulture and the wider wine-producing tradition of the Limassol District. It is also home to the Cyprus Wine Museum, located on Paphou Street in Erimi, which presents the history of wine production in Cyprus. Erimi forms part of the group of western Limassol settlements incorporated into Kourion Municipality.

=== Kantou ===
Kantou is an inland municipal district west of Limassol, located north of Erimi. The district includes the Ayia Napa Chapel, located about two kilometres northeast of Kantou, which is associated with a small medieval monastic community. Kantou was one of the former communities merged into Kourion Municipality as part of the 2024 reform.

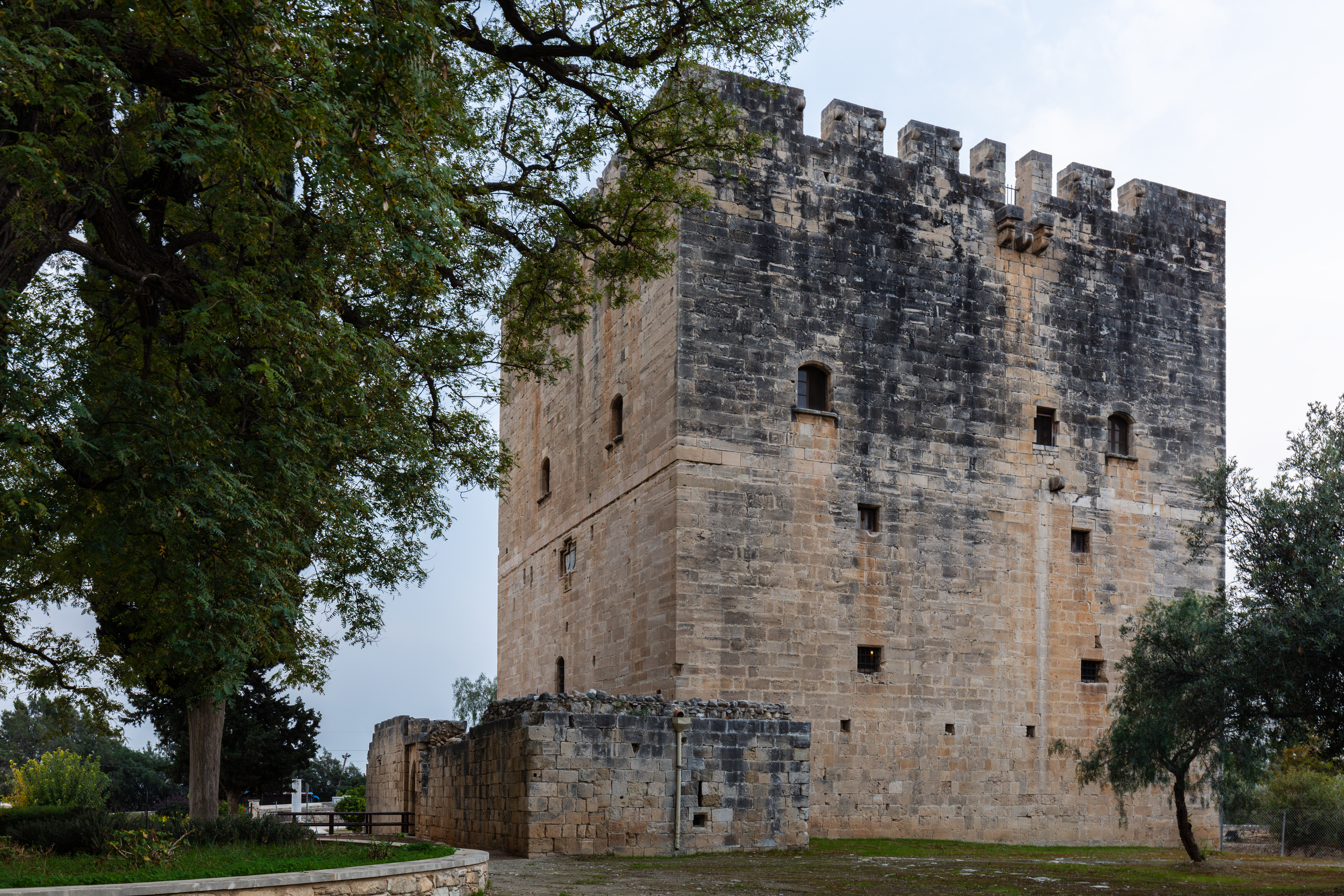
View of Kolossi Castle

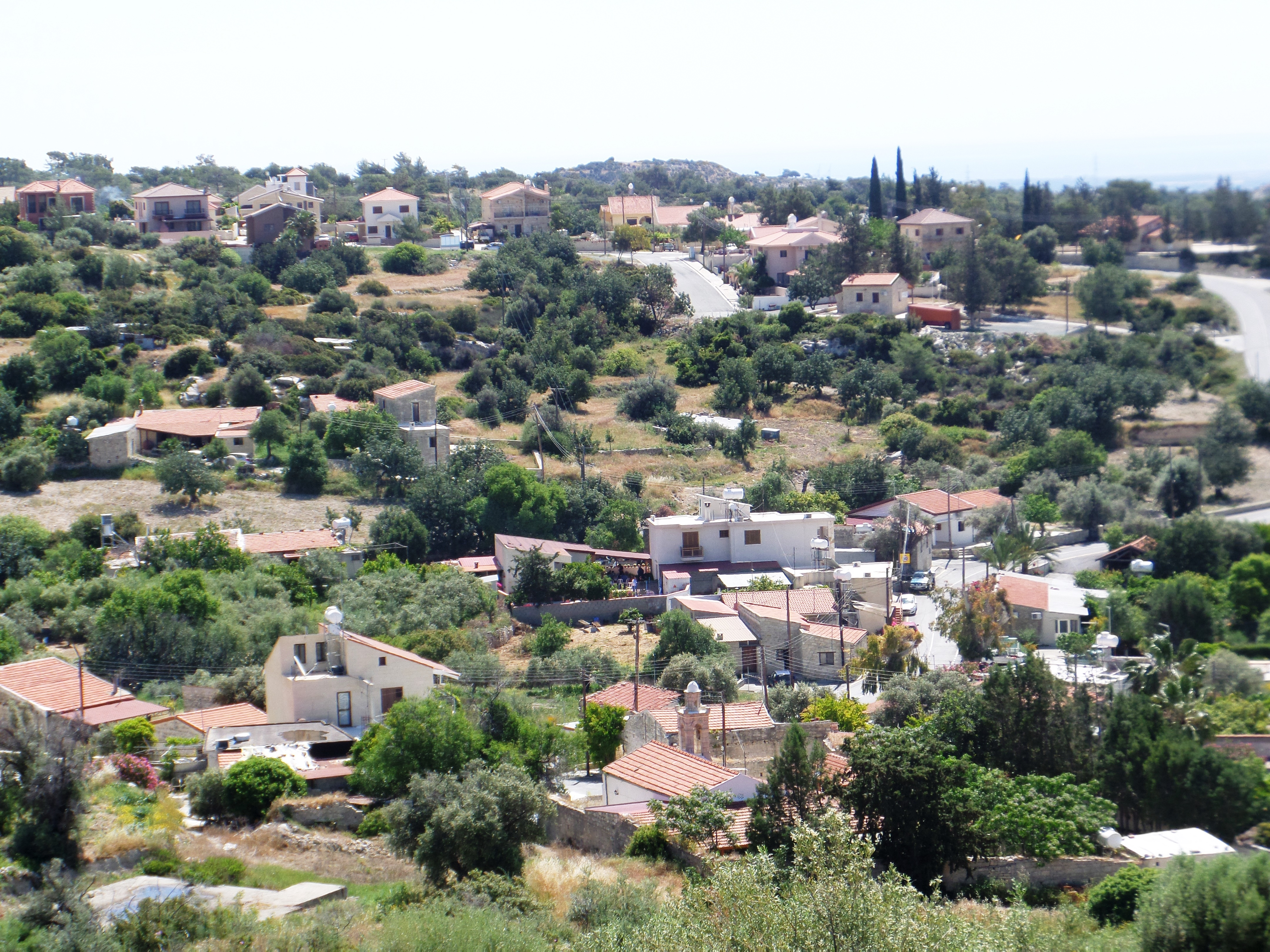
View of Sotira Village

=== Kolossi ===
Kolossi is a municipal district best known for Kolossi Castle, a medieval fortress located on the south-western edge of the village. The site was associated with the Order of St John of Jerusalem, after the land of Kolossi was granted to the order in the early 13th century. The current castle was built in the 15th century and the area was historically linked with the production of sugar and Commandaria wine. Kolossi forms one of the main heritage areas within Kourion Municipality.

=== Sotira ===
Sotira is a municipal district in the western part of Kourion Municipality. It is one of the larger rural areas of the municipality by administrative area and includes land connected with the wider Episkopi and Akrotiri landscape. The area is crossed by the Symvoulos stream and includes part of the Episkopi State Forest, while a large part of its administrative area falls within the British Sovereign Base Area.

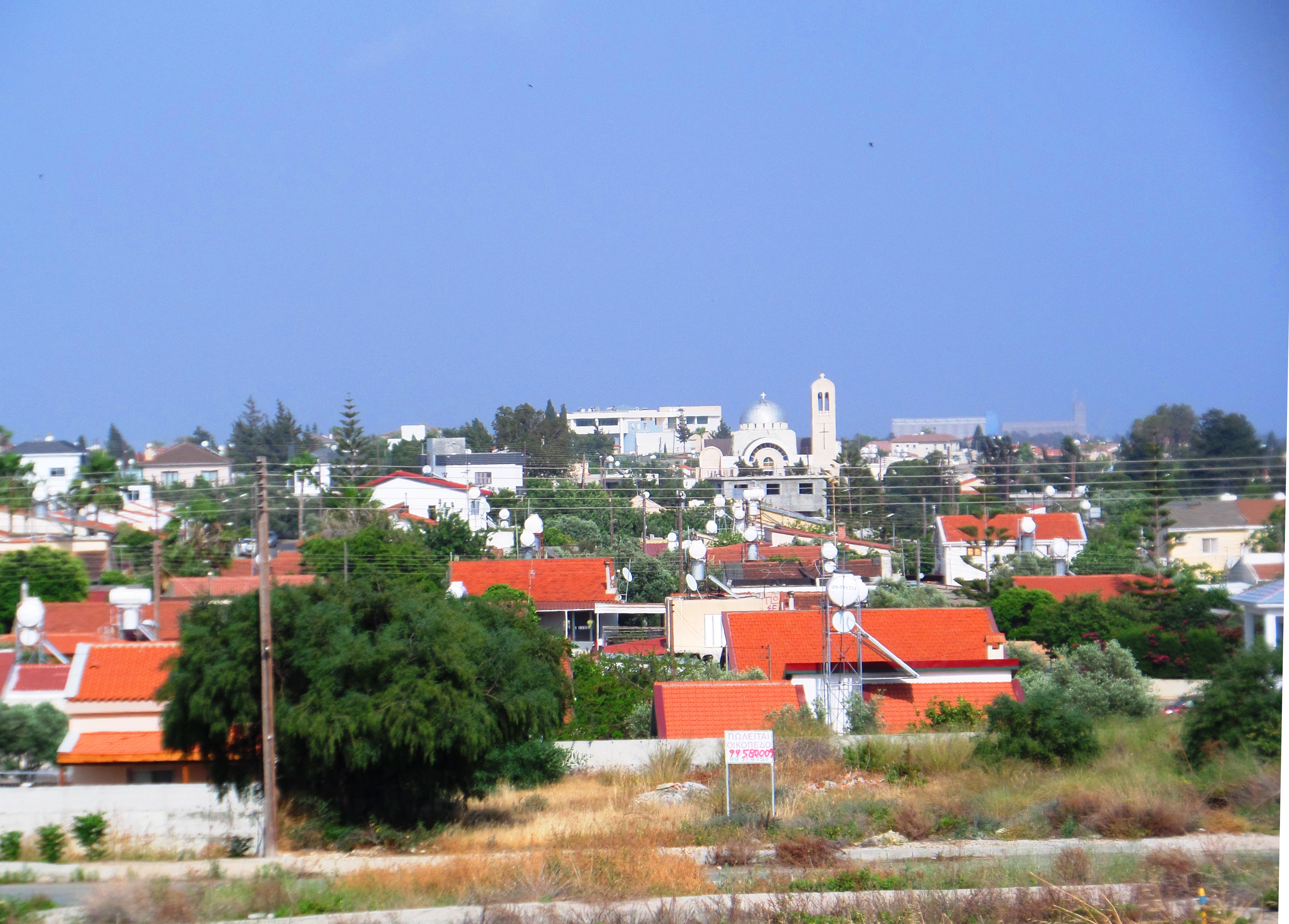
View of Trachoni Village

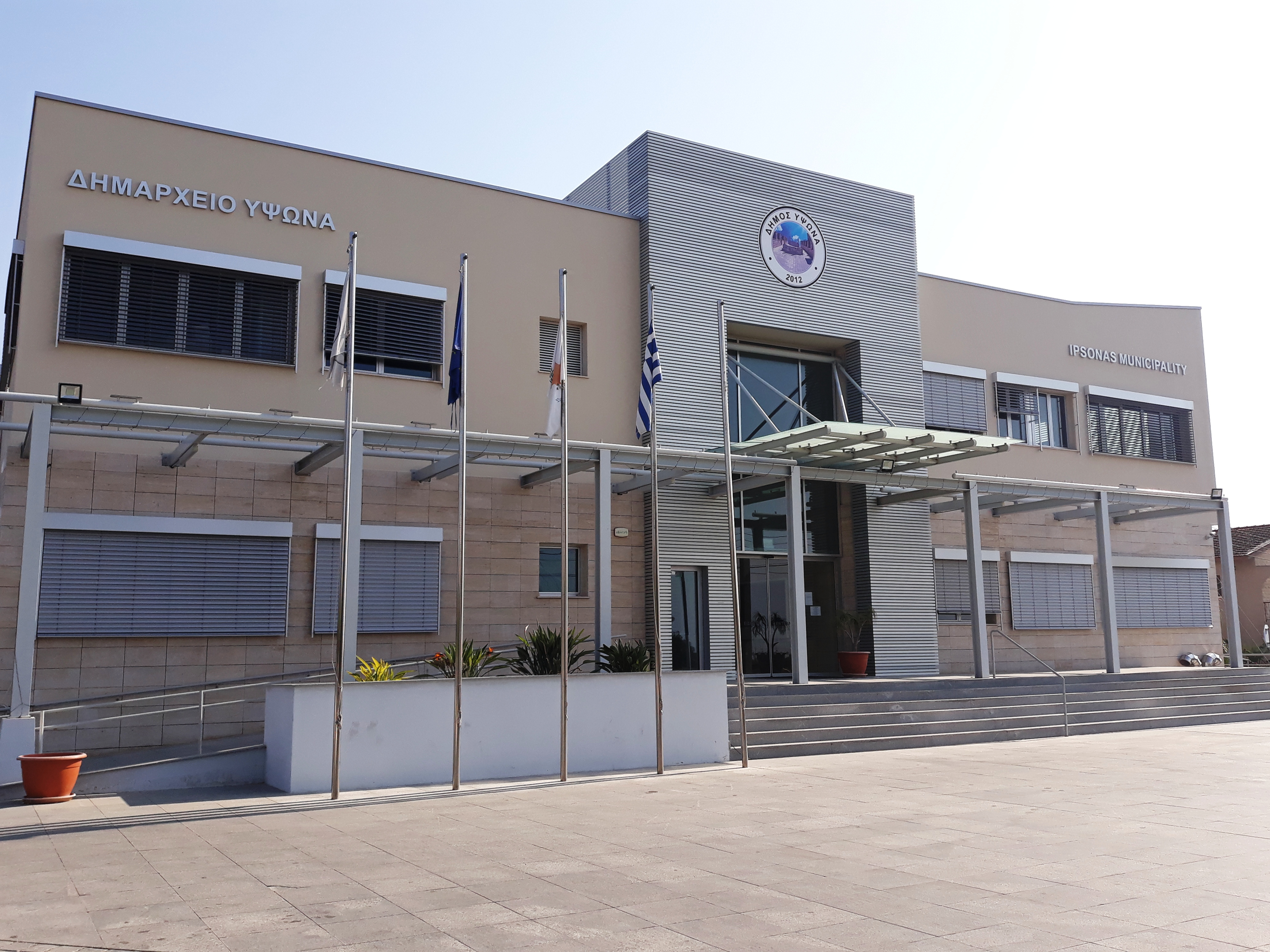
The Kourion (formerly Ypsonas) Municipality Town Hall

=== Trachoni ===
Trachoni is a municipal district west of Limassol near Akrotiri. It was formerly a separate community prior to its incorporation in Kourion Municipality during the 2024 local government reform. Trachoni is well known for its agricultural land with cultivations such as citrus fruit, grain and vineyards.

=== Ypsonas ===
Ypsonas, formerly Ypsonas Municipality, is the municipal seat and main administrative centre of Kourion Municipality. It was a municipality before the 2024 local government reform and remains the largest urban centre within the new municipality. Located west of Limassol, Ypsonas has experienced significant population growth and urban development, while also containing industrial areas that form part of the wider Limassol economy. Kourion Municipality is headquartered in Ypsonas, at the former Ypsonas Municipal Hall.

== Geography and landmarks ==
=== Location and extent ===
The Kourion Municipality is located in the western part of Limassol District and it extends across both the coastal and inland areas west of the city of Limassol. The municipality stretches from the Akrotiri Peninsula in the south and the Episkopi-Kourion coastal area in the south-west, to settlements further east and inland, including Ypsonas and Trachoni.

The municipality covers an area of approximately 182.04 square kilometres, calculated from the sum of the areas of its nine municipal districts. Its population is approximately 35,000 to 38,000 residents.

=== Physical geography ===
The geography of Kourion Municipality includes coastal cliffs, beaches, rural inland settlements, agricultural areas and urban development distributed in each municipal district with more concentrated urban development around Ypsonas. The coastal areas of the municipality are associated with Episkopi Bay, Kourion Beach, and the wider Akrotiri Peninsula, while the inland districts include settlements with agricultural and viticultural activity.

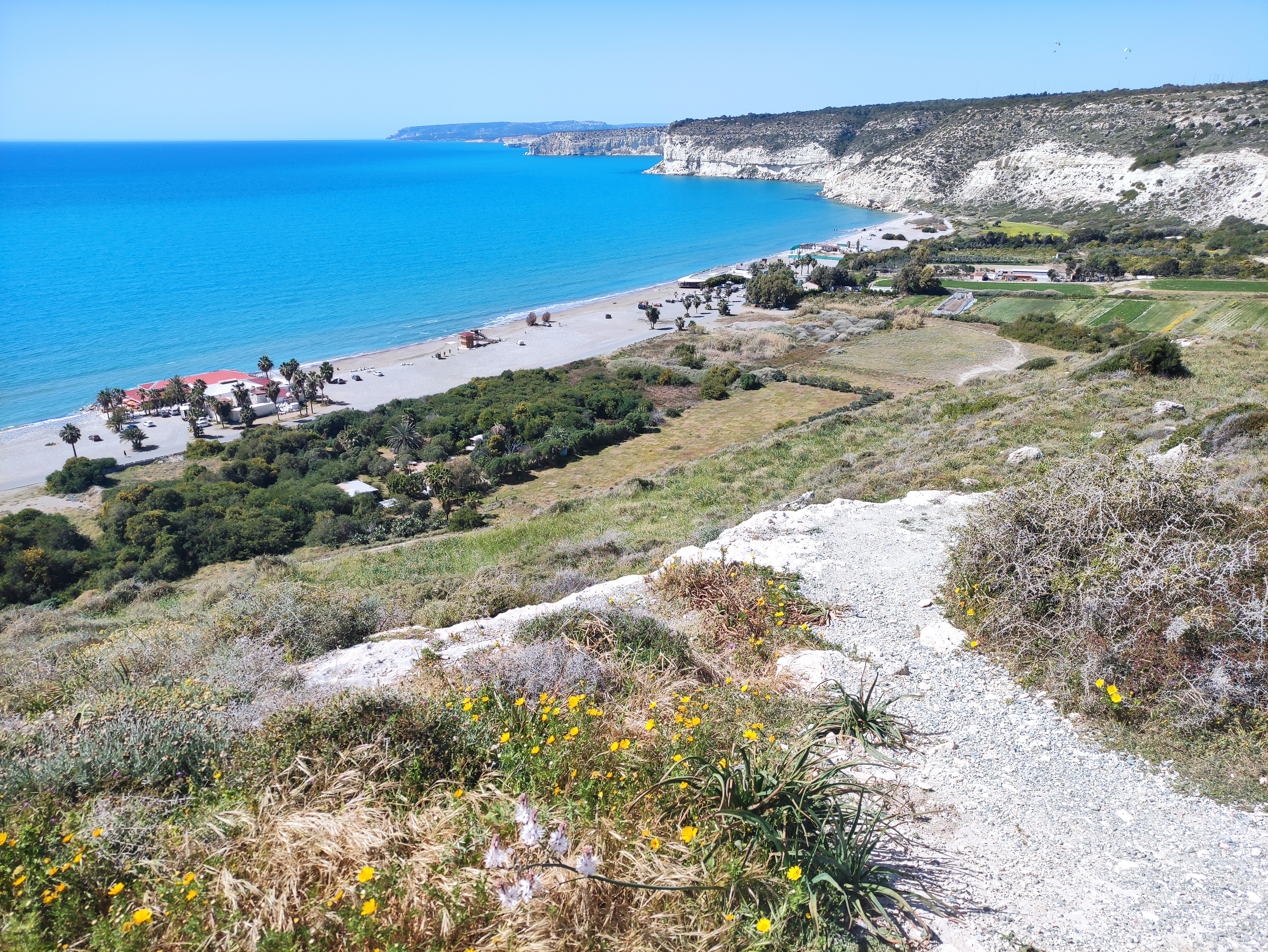
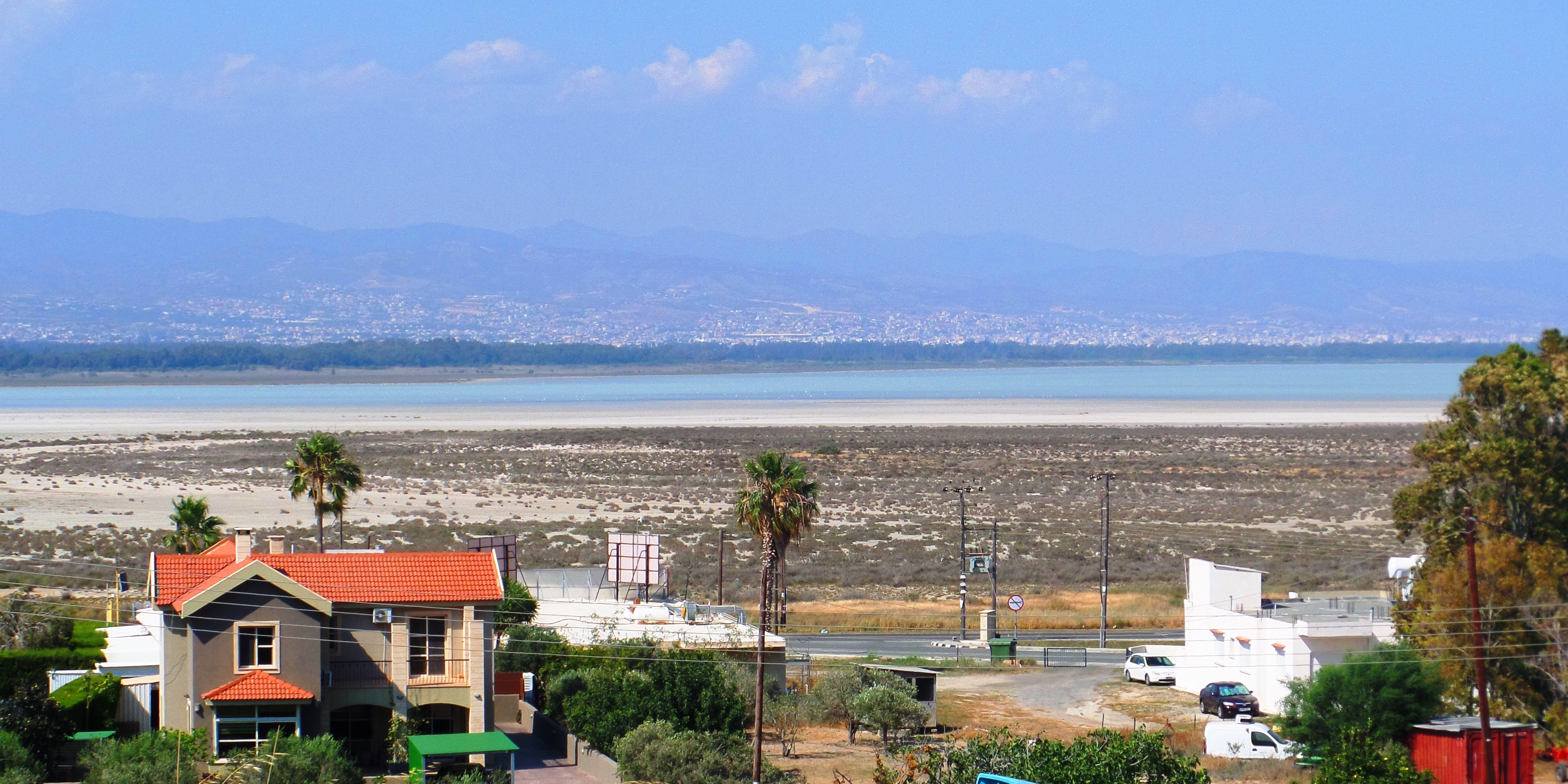
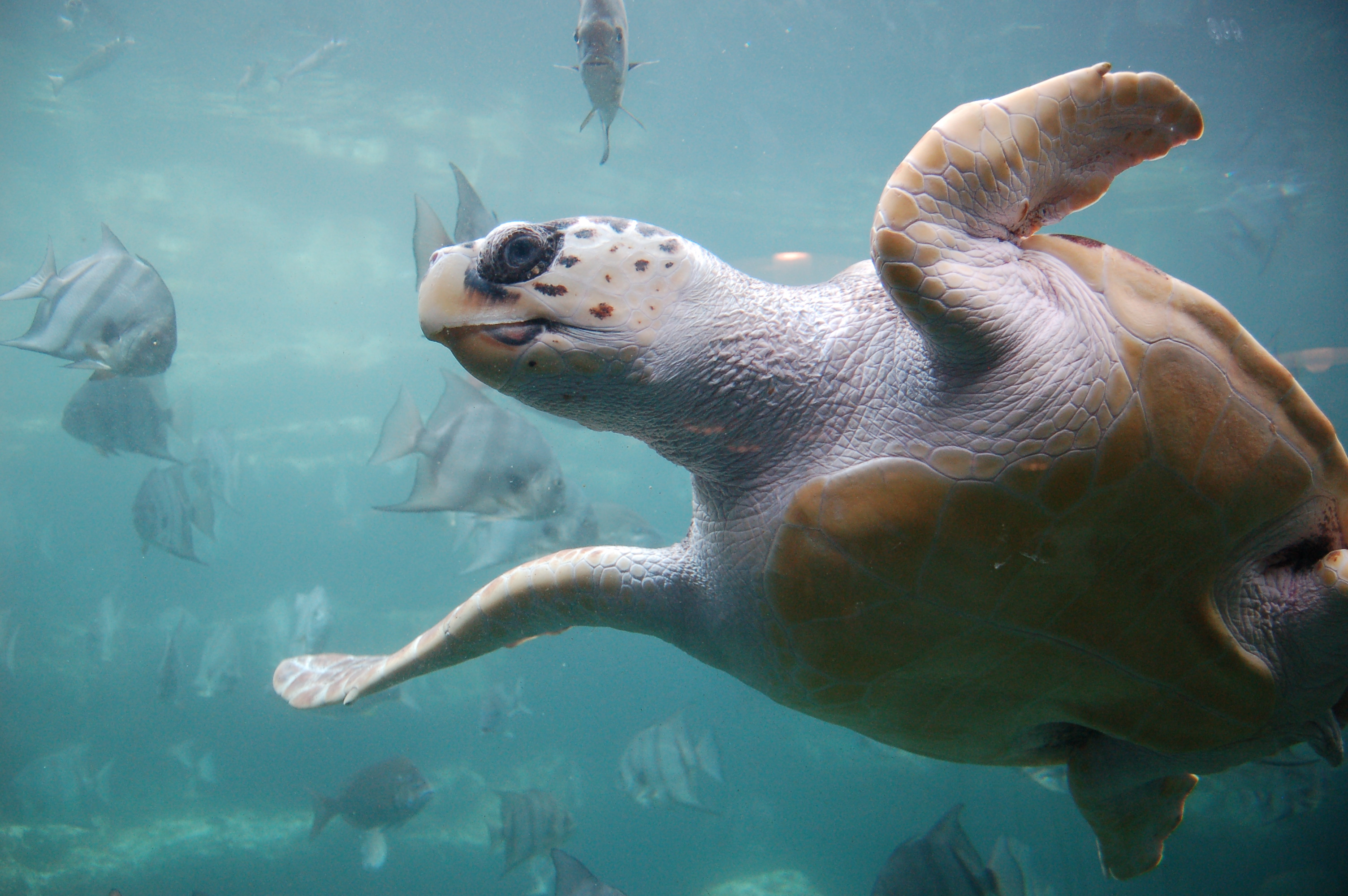
The municipality is host to a high biodiversity with its areas of environmental interest. These include wetlands such as the Limassol Salt Lake, coastal habitats that are home to various wildlife such as the loggerhead sea turtle (Caretta caretta) and green sea turtle (Chelonia mydas), and environmental education sites such as the Akrotiri Environmental Education Centre.

As Kourion Municipality was established in 2024, some geographical data remains more commonly available for its individual municipal districts than for the municipality as a single administrative unit. For this reason, geographical descriptions of the municipality often draw on district-level information from areas such as Ypsonas, Sotira and Akrotiri.

The physical geography of Kourion Municipality includes coastal lowlands, inland agricultural areas, higher inland terrain around Ypsonas and Sotira, and wetland environments around the Akrotiri Peninsula. In the Ypsonas district, the landscape slopes from north to south, with elevations decreasing from about 476 metres near the northern boundary to 90 metres around the settlement and 20 metres towards the southern part of the district. Records show average annual rainfall of Ypsonas at around 440 millimetres.

The Sotira district is crossed by the Symvoulos stream and reaches its highest point at Rofesia, at 386 metres. It also includes part of the Episkopi State Forest. Around the Akrotiri Peninsula, the municipality is associated with the Akrotiri Wetland System, which includes Akrotiri Salt Lake, salt marshes, freshwater marshes and ponds. The wider Akrotiri Wetland System is described as the largest complex of natural wetlands on the island and one of the most important areas for birds in Cyprus.

=== Sovereign Base Area overlap ===
A notable geographical feature that is unique to the Kourion Municipality, is its overlap with the Sovereign Base Area of Akrotiri, which is administered by the United Kingdom. This is particularly relevant to the municipal districts of Akrotiri, Asomatos, Episkopi and Sotira, where parts of the surrounding territory lie within or adjoin the SBA.

The presence of the SBA gives the municipality a distinctive administrative geography, as parts of its local settlement pattern, coastal zone, and surrounding land from villages overlap territories administered by the Republic of Cyprus and the British-administered base area.

Below is an illustrative map indicating the regions of the Kourion Municipality showcasing the regions under the jurisdiction of the Republic of Cyprus and the areas under the jurisdiction of the United Kingdom through the Sovereign Base Area of Akrotiri. The map also showcases positions of UK SBA facilities, the approximate position of the Municipal Hall, each Municipal District Centre, the approximate position of Limassol city, and of significant cultural monuments such as that of Ancient Kourion and of Kolossi Castle.

==== Kourion Municipality Illustrative Map ====
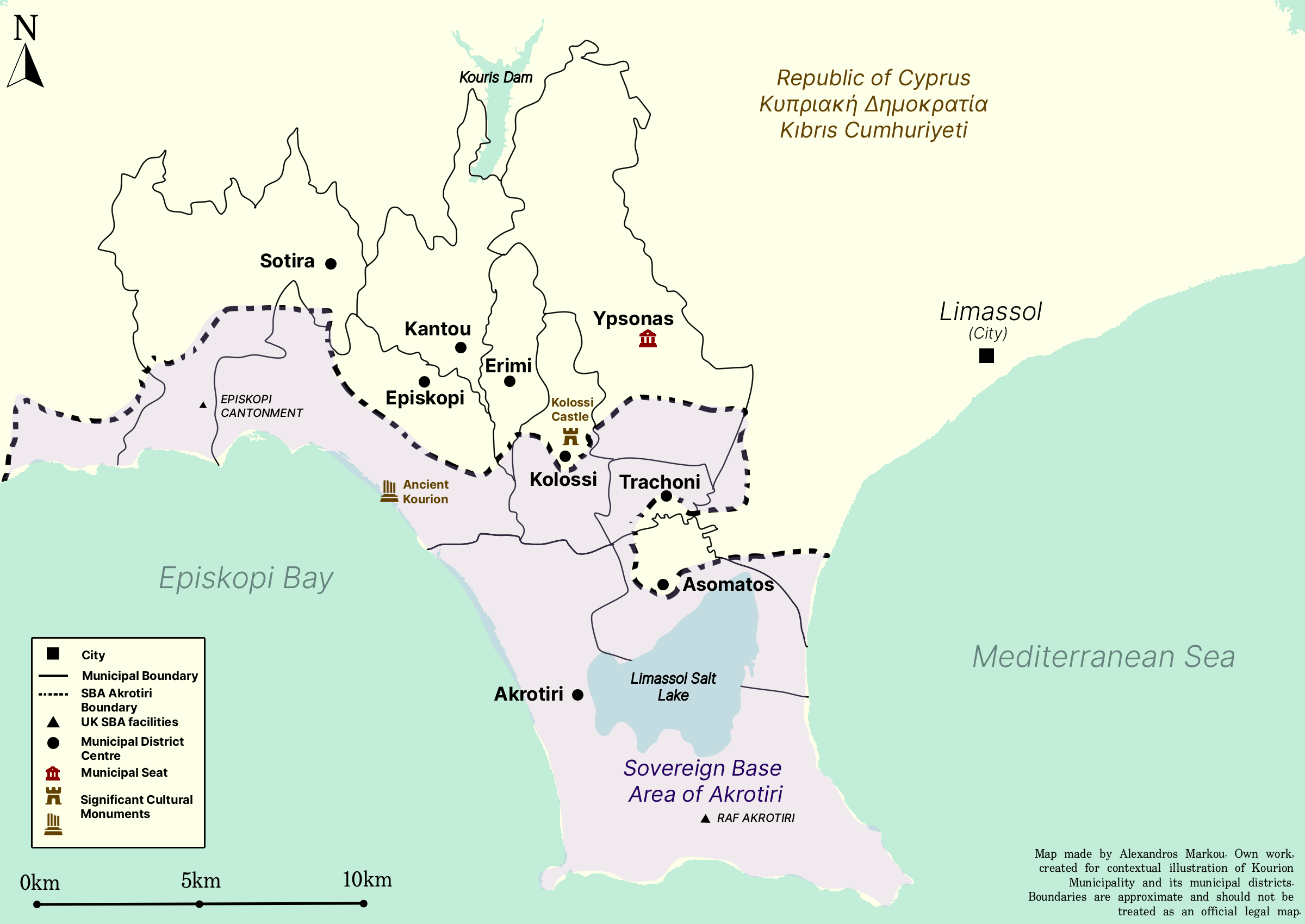

=== Major landmarks ===
The municipality contains several archaeological, medieval, environmental and cultural landmarks. The ancient city of Kourion – near Episkopi – is one of the most important archaeological sites in Cyprus and includes remains such as the Greco-Roman theatre, early Christian basilica, Roman agora, public baths and mosaic floors. The site occupies a prominent coastal position upon a cliff overlooking Episkopi Bay and forms one of the main historical reference points for the municipality.

Near ancient Kourion is the Sanctuary of Apollo Hylates, located about three kilometres west of the Kourion archaeological site. Apollo Hylates was a worshipped protector of Kourion, and archaeological evidence suggests that worship at the sanctuary lasted from the 8th century BC to the 4th century AD. The sanctuary developed over several historical periods and became one of the important religious centres of ancient Cyprus.

Environmental landmarks on and around the Akrotiri Peninsula also are of notable mention. The Limassol Salt Lake (also known as the Akrotiri Salt Lake) located southwest of Limassol City, is the largest inland body of water in Cyprus and is considered one of the most important wetlands in the eastern Mediterranean due to its importance to the local wildlife of the region and migrating birds including the greater flamingo (Phoenicopterus roseus).

Other notable local landmarks include the Cyprus Wine Museum in Erimi, which presents history of wine production in Cyprus, and the Municipal Theatre in Ypsonas, that hosts theatrical and cultural events.
