= Kouris River =

River in Cyprus

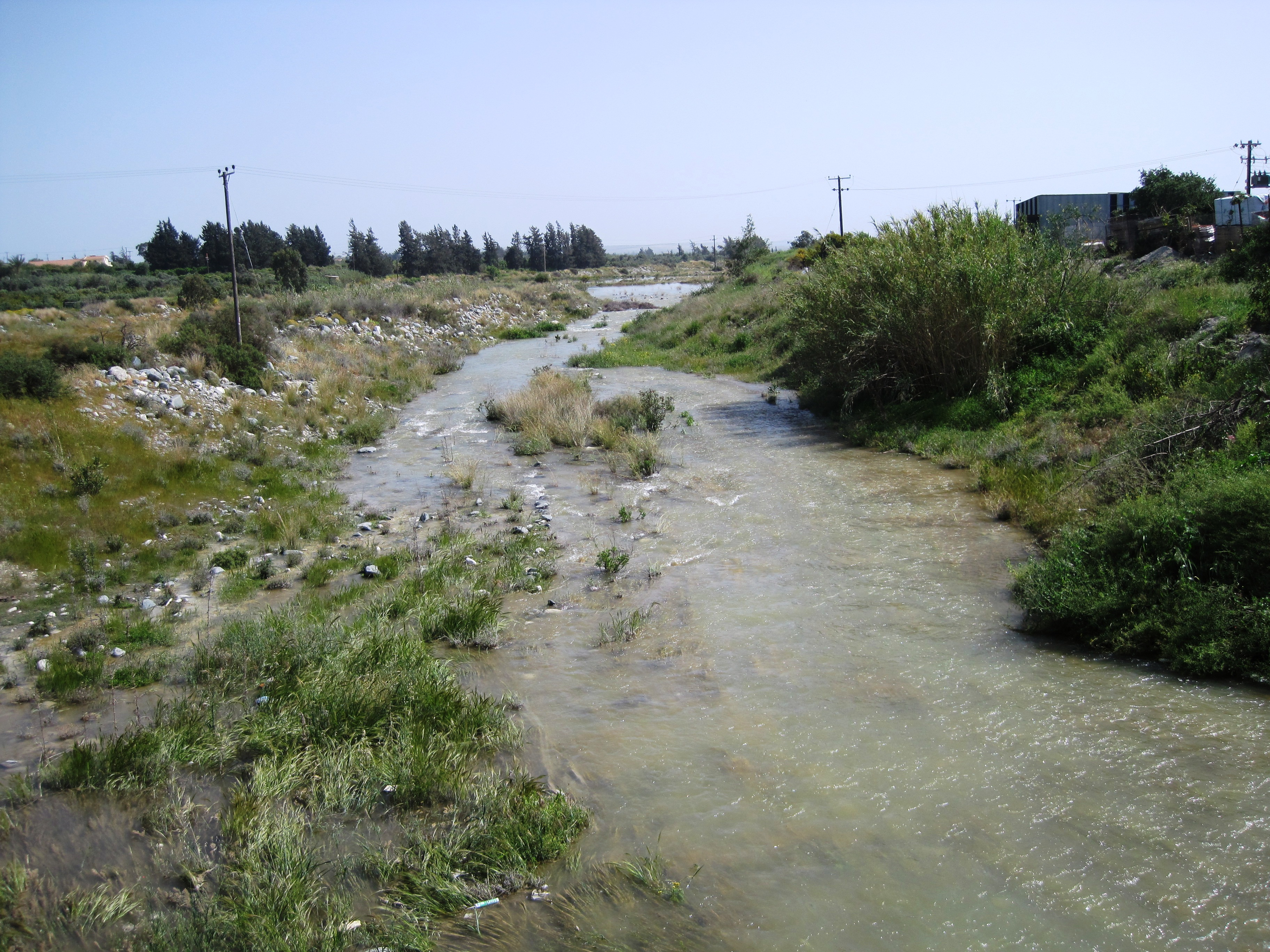
Lower section of the Kouris River

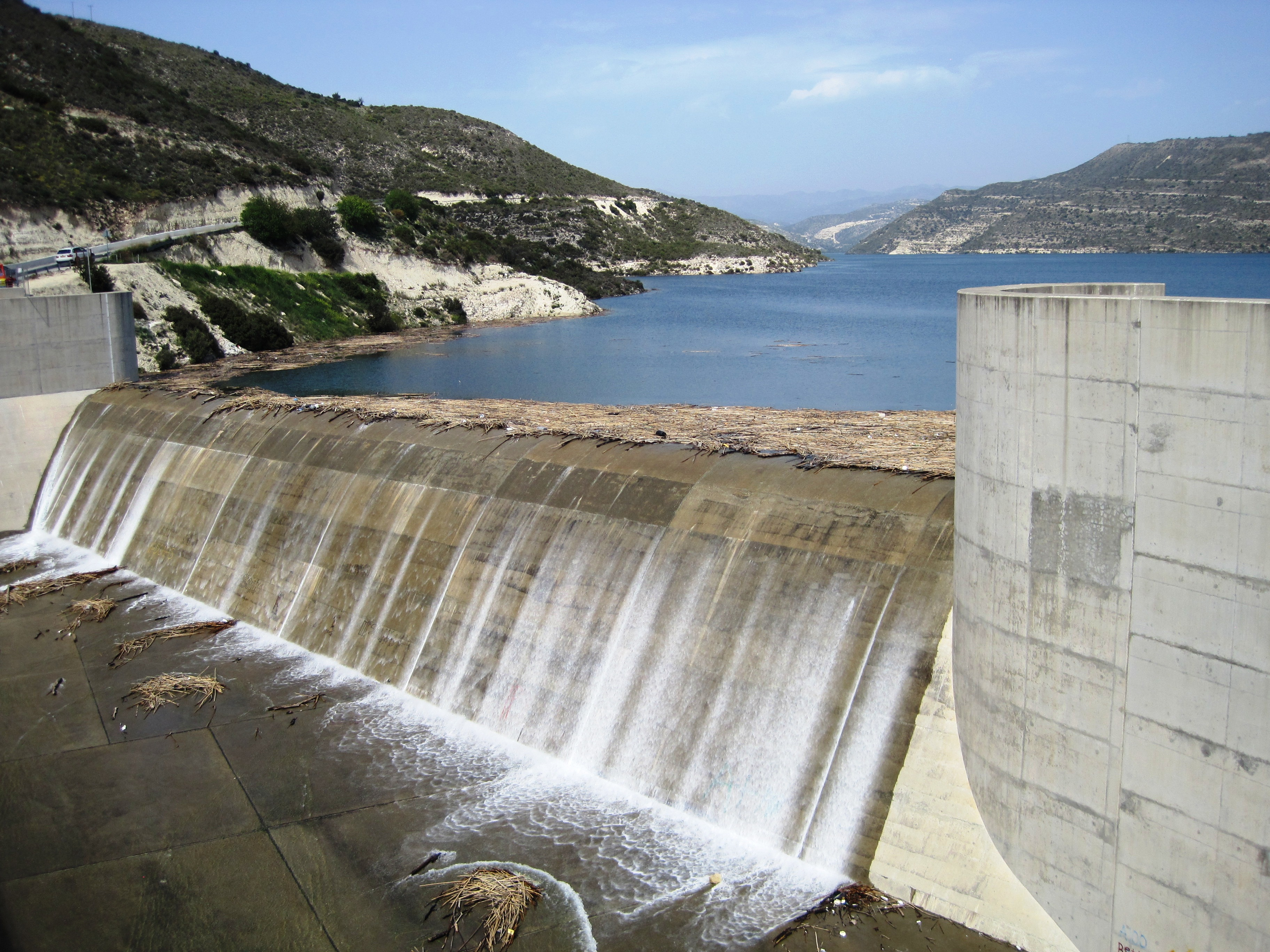
Kouris Dam

Kouris River (Greek Κούρης; Turkish Kuris) is a waterway in Cyprus. Measuring 38 kilometres (24 mi) in length, it originates on the south part of the Troodos Mountains, traverses Limassol District, and reaches the sea at Kourion. Not much of the river exists in the lower reaches of its course after the building of the Kouris Dam in the 1980s. This had to effect of enlarging the river's northern basin. Erimi is situated on the river's eastern side, while Kantou is on the western portion. Episkopi, built atop Kourion, is situated near the river's western bank. Luigi Palma di Cesnola explored the area around the river's mouth and reported on it the 1870s.

== Bibliography ==
- Bekker-Nielsen, Tønnes (2004). The Roads of Ancient Cyprus. Museum Tusculanum Press. ISBN 978-87-7289-956-5.
- Jasink, Anna Margherita; Bombardieri, Luca (2010). Researches in Cypriote History and Archaeology: Proceedings of the Meeting Held in Florence, April 29-30th 2009. Firenze University Press. ISBN 978-88-6453-134-2.
