= Sterakovou =

Sterakovou Στερακόβου
- settlement
- Location in Cyprus
- Coordinates: 34°42′37″N 32°49′55″E
- Country: Cyprus
- District: Limassol District

Population (2001)
  - Total: 0
- Time zone: UTC+2 (EET)
  - Summer (DST): UTC+3 (EEST)

Sterakovou (Greek: Στερακόβου) was a Greek Cypriot agricultural settlement. In 1974 it was abandoned. It's part of Sotira, Limassol.
