= Kantou =

Kantou may refer to:

- Kantō region, an area of Japan
- Kantou, Cyprus, a town in Cyprus
- Kantou (plant), a genus of plants, now treated as a synonym of Inhambanella
