= Asomatos, Limassol =

Asomatos: Ασώματος (Greek); Gözügüzel (Turkish)
- Village and Municipal district
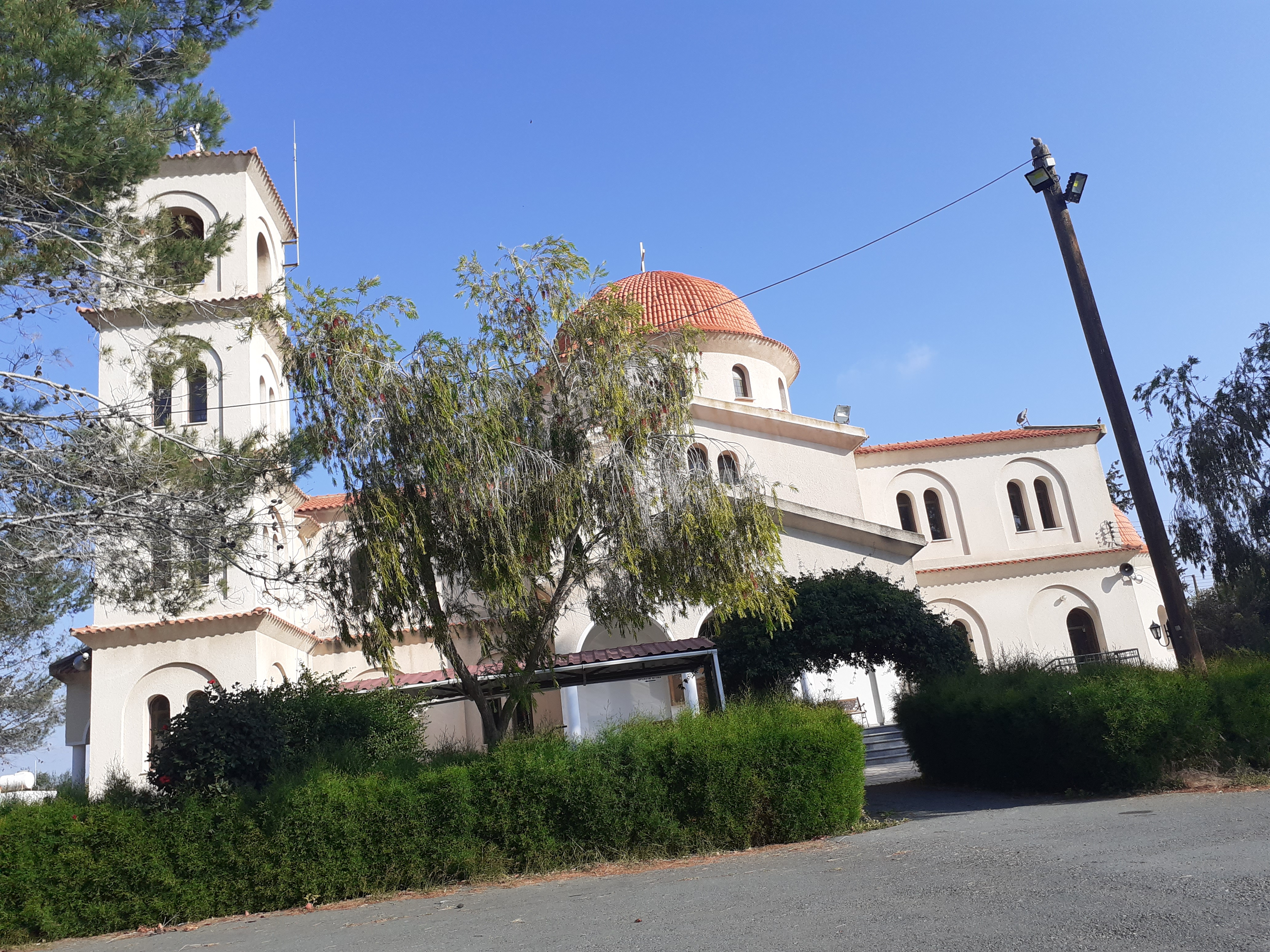
- Greek Orthodox church in Asomatos
- Interactive map of Asomatos
- Location within Cyprus Location within the Eastern Mediterranean Location within the European Union Location within Asia
- Coordinates: 34°38′14″N 32°57′36″E
- Country: Cyprus
- District: Limassol District
- Municipality: Kourion Municipality
- Incorporated into Kourion Municipality: 1 July 2024

Government
  - Body: Municipal Council of Kourion
  - Deputy mayor: Elena Themistokleous

Population (2021)
  - Total: 895
- Time zone: UTC+2 (EET)
  - Summer (DST): UTC+3 (EEST)
- Website: kourion.org

Asomatos (Greek: Ασώματος; Turkish: Gözügüzel) is a village and municipal district of Kourion Municipality in Limassol District, Cyprus. It is situated on the Akrotiri Peninsula, approximately 7 kilometres west of Limassol, near the Sovereign Base Area of Akrotiri. Parts of the surrounding area lie within the Sovereign Base Areas of Akrotiri and Dhekelia, a British Overseas Territory administered by the United Kingdom.

Prior to the 2024 local government reform in Cyprus, Asomatos was a separate community. It became one of the nine municipal districts of Kourion Municipality on 1 July 2024.

== History ==
The name Asomatos means “without body” in Greek. In 1958, Turkish Cypriots adopted the alternative name Gözügüzel, meaning “the one with beautiful eyes”. During the British period, the population of the village was mixed; Turkish Cypriots became the majority after 1931, and the Turkish Cypriot proportion of the population reached 55% in 1960. The Turkish Cypriots of the village fled again in July 1974, mainly going to the Sovereign British Base Areas, and were later transferred to the north of Cyprus in February 1975 via Turkey.

== Local government ==
Following the 2024 local government reform, Asomatos became a municipal district of Kourion Municipality. It is represented within the municipality by a deputy mayor and forms part of the wider municipal administration.
