= Sotira, Limassol =

Sotira: Σωτήρα (Greek); Sotira (Turkish)
- Village and Municipal district
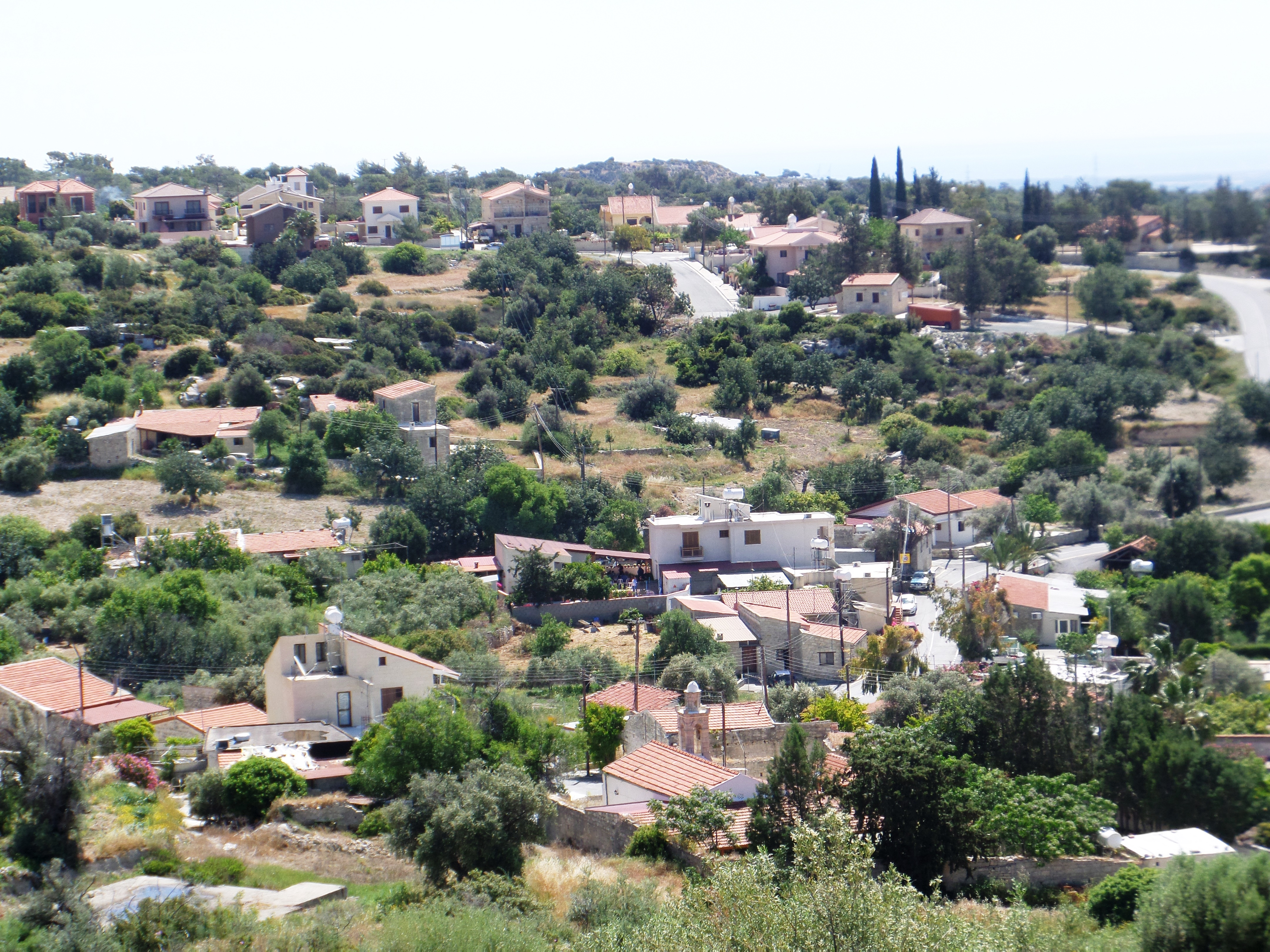
- View of Sotira
- Interactive map of Sotira
- Location within Cyprus Location within the Eastern Mediterranean Location within the European Union Location within Asia
- Coordinates: 34°42′44″N 32°51′47″E
- Country: Cyprus
- District: Limassol District
- Municipality: Kourion Municipality
- Incorporated into Kourion Municipality: 1 July 2024

Government
  - Body: Municipal Council of Kourion
  - Deputy mayor: Nikos Nikolaou

Area
  - Total: 44.35 km^{2} (17.12 sq mi)

Population (2021)
  - Total: 232
  - Density: 5.23/km^{2} (13.5/sq mi)
- Time zone: UTC+2 (EET)
  - Summer (DST): UTC+3 (EEST)
- Website: kourion.org

Sotira (Greek: Σωτήρα; Turkish: Sotira) is a village and municipal district of the Kourion Municipality located partly in the Limassol District of Cyprus, and partly in the British Overseas Territory of Akrotiri and Dhekelia, west of Limassol, near Episkopi.

== Sotira Culture ==
Sotira Culture (Ceramic Neolithic Period, 5000–4000 BCE) filled the gap left by the abandonment of Khirokitia Culture sites. The culture appears to have formed about two centuries after the first influx of pottery on the island, brought in by a new wave of settlers who arrived around 5250 BC. Some sources place the rise of the Sotira at a later date, around 4500 BC, but most seem to agree that there was a gap of about five hundred years between the fall of the Khirokitia and the first appearance of the Sotira. Despite evidence of settlers who brought new technologies and techniques with them, there is no evidence of any external trade. Social stratification is also difficult to ascertain during this comparatively short-lived period.

The culture gained its name through the examination of a typical site at Sotira-Teppes. At the Sotíra Neolithic settlement lies a tightly packed group of house foundations of light construction. They ranged in form from circular to rectangular with rounded angles, the upper parts of the walls were evidently of mud brick and the roofs of the rectangular houses probably flat. The topmost floors overlay a demolition layer which sealed well-preserved hearths, post-holes, and other features. These lower floors yielded an unusually rich series of implements of flint, stone and bone, as well as bowls and jugs of the combed ware. Like most Ceramic Neolithic sites, this was located near the coast, on high ground which was easily defendable. Another key site is at Ayios Epiktitos-Vyrsi. Ceramic sites are only found on the east of the island, showing that these newcomers did not reach either the west or the Karpas Peninsula. There were regional differences, and technical improvements as the culture progressed. Of the thirty villages known to have been home to the culture, only a few were still inhabited in the next period but, as with the Khirokitia before it, why the majority of Sotira sites were abandoned is not known.
