= Trachoni, Limassol =

Village in Limassol District, Cyprus

Trachoni: Τραχώνι (Greek); Kayakale (Turkish); Trahon
- Village and Municipal district
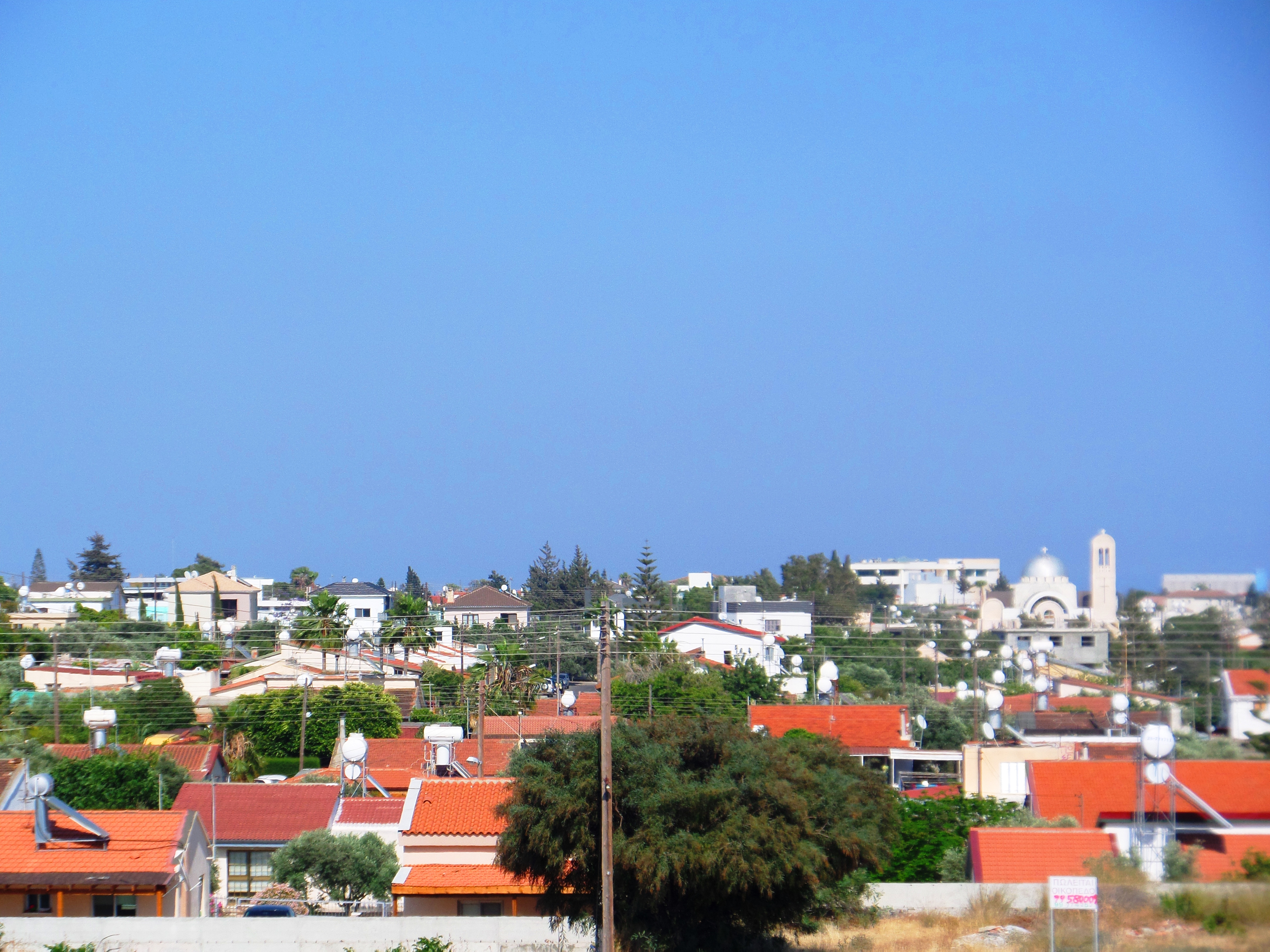
- Aerial view of Trachoni
- Interactive map of Trachoni
- Location within Cyprus Location within the Eastern Mediterranean Location within the European Union Location within Asia
- Coordinates: 34°39′30″N 32°57′41″E
- Country: Cyprus
- District: Limassol District
- Municipality: Kourion Municipality
- Incorporated into Kourion Municipality: 1 July 2024

Government
  - Body: Municipal Council of Kourion
  - Deputy mayor: Kyriakos Christodoulou

Population (2021)
  - Total: 4,549
- Time zone: UTC+2 (EET)
  - Summer (DST): UTC+3 (EEST)
- Website: kourion.org

Trachoni (Greek: Τραχώνι; Turkish: Trahon) Ancient Greek for rugged/stony ground, is a village and municipal district of Kourion Municipality in Limassol District, Cyprus. It lies west of Limassol and near the Akrotiri Peninsula. Before the 2024 local government reform, Trachoni was a separate community; it was incorporated into Kourion Municipality on 1 July 2024.

As of the 2011 census, Trachoni had a population of 3,952. Prior to 1974, the village was inhabited by both Greek Cypriots and Turkish Cypriots, with Greek Cypriots forming the majority.

== Local government ==
Following the 2024 local government reform in Cyprus, Trachoni became one of the nine municipal districts of Kourion Municipality. It is represented in the municipality by a deputy mayor and elected municipal councillors.
