= Kantou, Cyprus =

Kantou: Καντού (Greek); Çanakkale (Turkish)
- Village and Municipal district
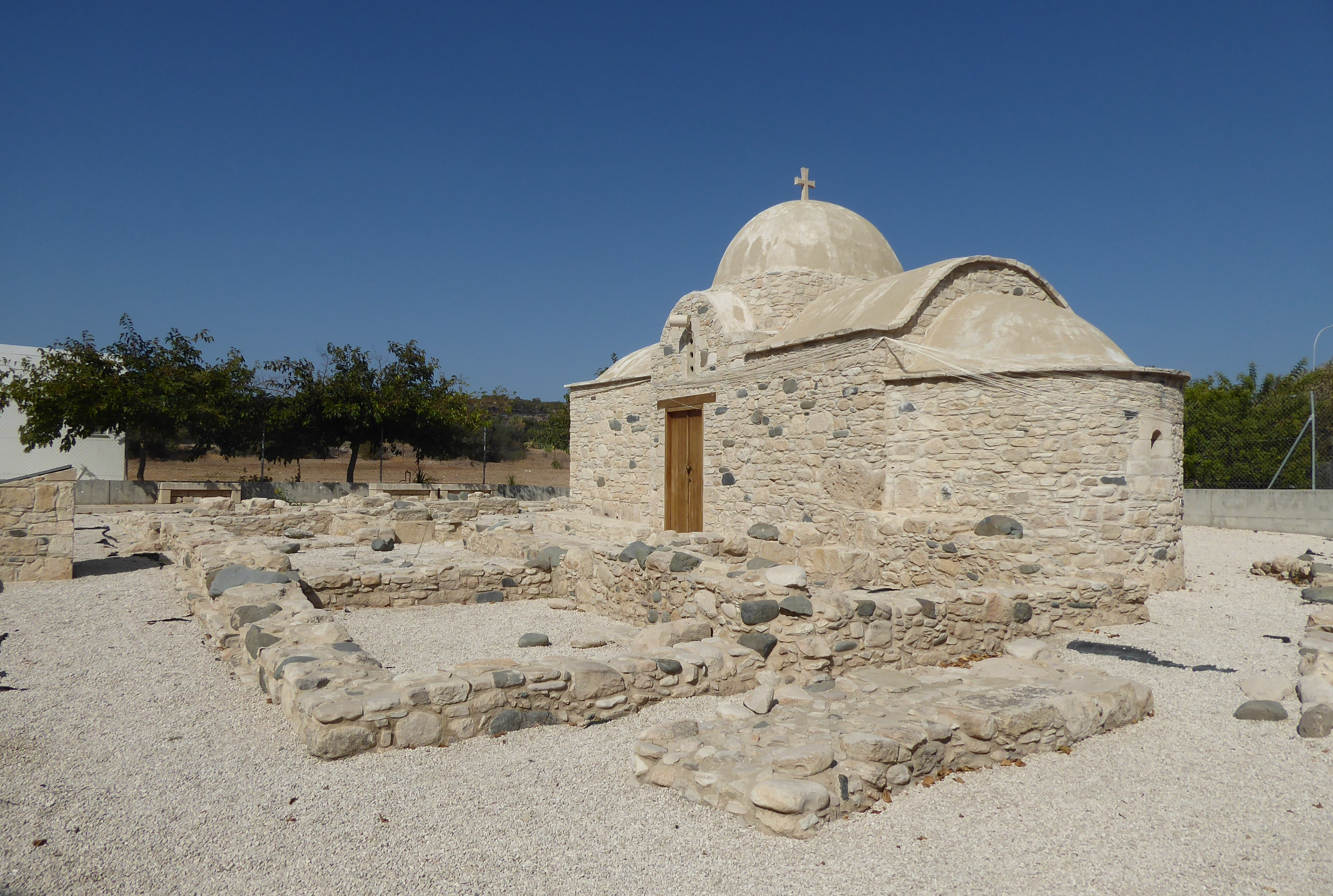
- Church of Agia Marina in Kantou
- Interactive map of Kantou
- Location within Cyprus Location within the Eastern Mediterranean Location within the European Union Location within Asia
- Coordinates: 34°41′25″N 32°54′24″E
- Country: Cyprus
- District: Limassol District
- Municipality: Kourion Municipality
- Incorporated into Kourion Municipality: 1 July 2024

Government
  - Body: Municipal Council of Kourion
  - Deputy mayor: Sofoklis Georgiou

Population (2021)
  - Total: 417
- Time zone: UTC+2 (EET)
  - Summer (DST): UTC+3 (EEST)
- Website: kourion.org

Kantou (Greek: Καντού; Turkish: Çanakkale) is a village and municipal district of the Kourion Municipality in the Limassol District of Cyprus, located 2 km north of Erimi.

== History ==
According to archaeological excavations, the area was inhabited during the Late Neolithic period (4500–3800 BC).

Before the Ottoman conquest of Cyprus in 1571, the village was inhabited by Greek Cypriots. This is evidenced by the presence of several chapels in the area, which were built in the 15th century. Following the Ottoman conquest, Turkish settlers moved into the village. The village was almost exclusively inhabited by Turkish Cypriots until 1960.

== Culture, sports, and tourism ==
The Turkish Cypriot Çanakkale Sports Club was founded in 1963, and now competes in the Cyprus Turkish Football Association (CTFA) K-PET 2nd League.

== Bibliography ==
- Καρούζης, Γιώργος (2001). Περιδιαβάζοντας την Κύπρο: Λεμεσός (πόλη και επαρχία) [Wandering Through Cyprus: Limassol (City and District)] (πρώτη ed.). Λευκωσία: ΣΕΛΑΣ Κεντρο Μελετων Ερευνων & Εκδοσεων. p. 198-200. ISBN 9963-566-67-7.
