= Akrotiri (village) =

Akrotiri Ακρωτήρι Ağrotur
- Village
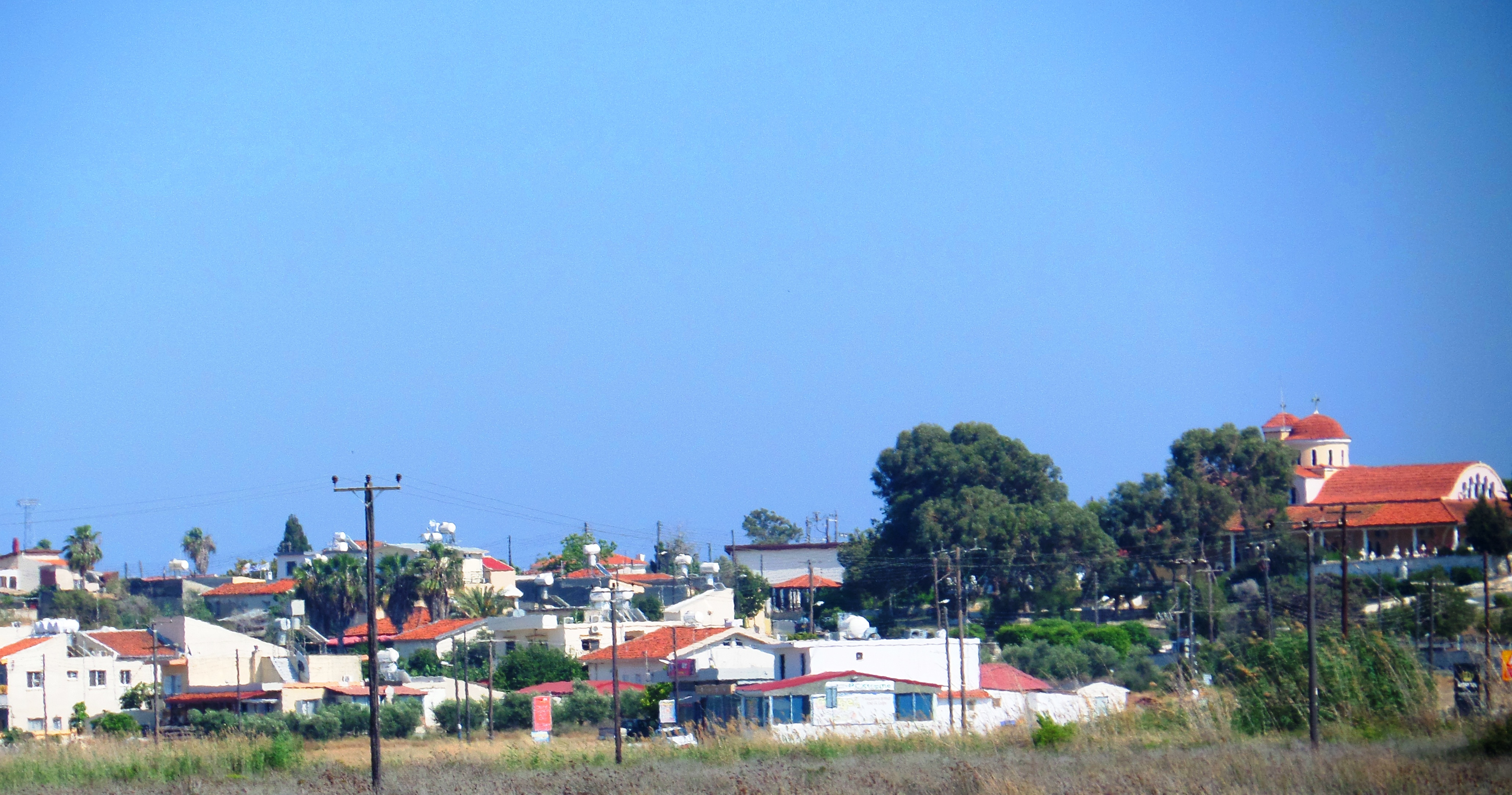

- Location in Cyprus
- Coordinates: 34°36′3″N 32°57′18″E
- Country: United Kingdom; Republic of Cyprus (Note: Akrotiri remains functionally integrated into Cyprus regarding its citizens, civil governance, and local municipal laws.)
- British Overseas Territory Limassol District (Note: In terms of civil governance, Akrotiri functions as a municipal district of Limassol's Kourion Municipality, leaving its residents fully integrated into the Republic of Cyprus's citizenry and administration.): Akrotiri and Dhekelia

Population (2021)
  - Total: 931
- Time zone: UTC+2 (EET)
  - Summer (DST): UTC+3 (EEST)
- Postal Code: 4640 (Cyprus postcode); BF1 2AT (SBA postcode)
- Website: https://visitakrotiri.cy/

Akrotiri (Greek: Ακρωτήρι, literally Cape, Turkish: Ağrotur) is a village within the Akrotiri Sovereign Base Area, which forms part of the British Overseas Territory of Akrotiri and Dhekelia. Administratively, it is in the Limassol District of the Republic of Cyprus. Though the area is under SBA territorial and security administration, the Akrotiri community council, after a Cyprus government decision in 2024, is now under the Kourion Municipality, which handles civil matters (Taxation, business, schools, voting). Akrotiri is one of the few villages in Cyprus where there is a double system working in order to ensure both the status of the SBAs for military use, and their non-use as a colony, as stipulated in the 1960 agreements with the Cypriot and British administrations, respectively, working closely with each other to ensure the effective running of both SBA and civil village administration.

The village contains two small churches dedicated to St. Cross and St. George. To the south is a site called Kourion (Greek: Κούριον) containing the ruins of an ancient settlement. Of the place Stefano Lusignan in his Description de toute l'isle de Cypre (Paris, 1580) says: "Cury est une ville antique, située au milieu du Promontoire des chats." ("Kouria is an ancient town situated in the middle of the Headland of Cats.").

== Administration ==
When the Sovereign Base Area was created, those living in Akrotiri were paid to allow them to move elsewhere. However, villagers argued that while the compensation assessed their housing, it did not account for their fields, and thus they were unable to move. In the end, the village remained in place, despite being located at the end of a runway.

Living in Akrotiri is restricted to those with local ties. While the village lies within the legal jurisdiction of the Sovereign Base Areas, the base administration is obliged by treaty to ensure that laws applying to the civilian population mirror closely the laws of the Republic of Cyprus. One area of difference is in land use restrictions, with many areas of the base having strict planning and zoning regulations. The village has its own elected representatives, who maintain relations with the base administration.

== Holy Monastery of St Nicholas of the Cats ==
Two kilometres east of the village—in the middle of fields and orchards—is the ancient monastery of Saint Nicholas of the Cats (Άγιος Νικόλαος των Γατών).

=== Early history ===
The monastery is mentioned by travellers in the fifteenth century, but the fullest account is given by Felix Fabri, a Dominican who visited Cyprus in 1480 and 1483. He mentions Saint Nicholas as an isolated monastery "surrounded by serpents" where the monks kept cats to protect themselves. Writing about a century later in the sixteenth century, Stefano Lusignan reports a tradition that associated the first establishment of this monastery to Saint Helena who, on her visit to Cyprus, found it infested with venomous snakes. Hundreds of cats from Egypt or Judea were imported to the place where her ship had landed, the Akrotiri peninsula. Kalokeros, then appointed as governor, is said to have founded the monastery and the cats attached themselves to the establishment thereafter.

=== Architectural remains ===
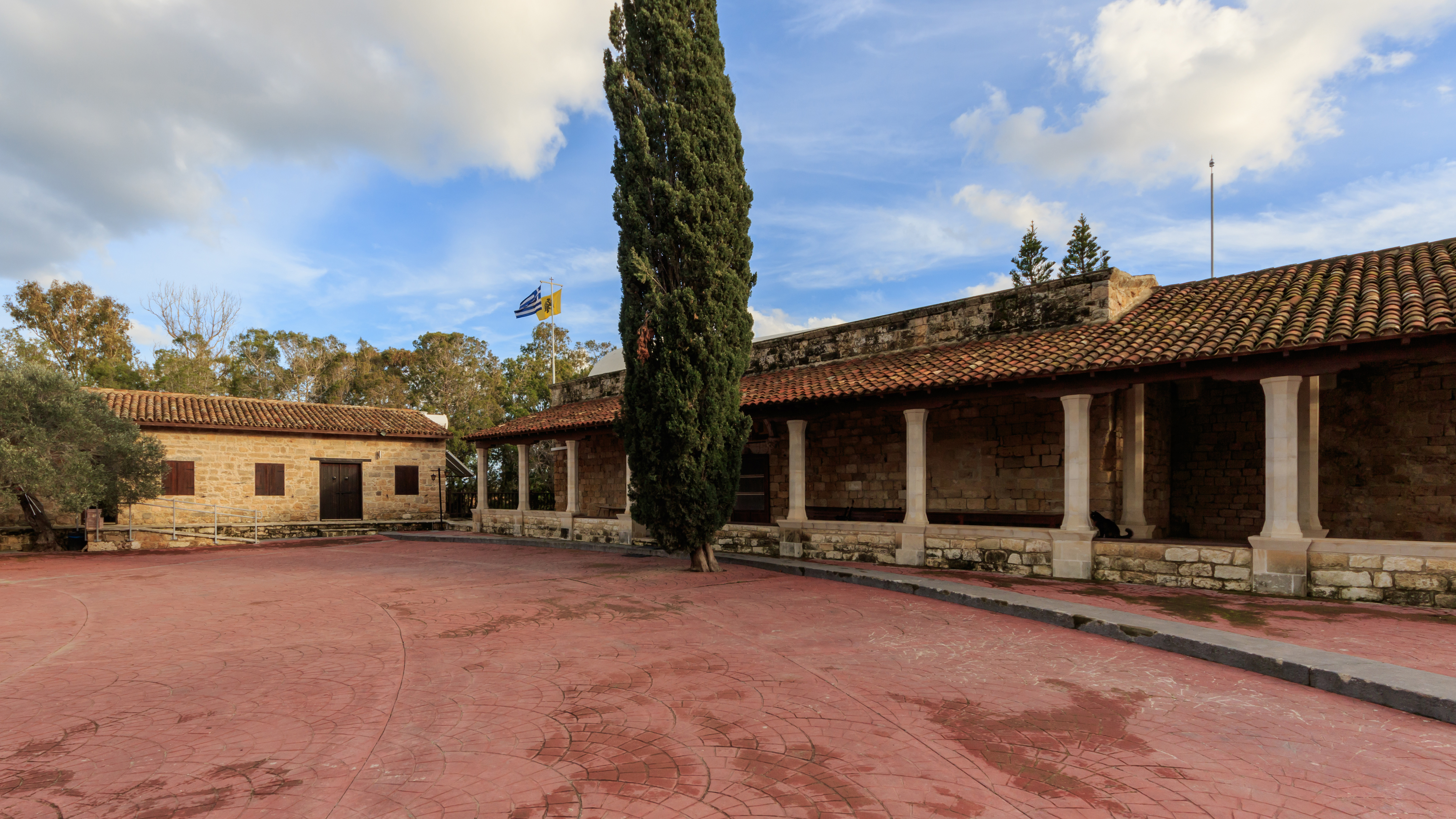
Saint Nicholas of the Cats, 2017

Parts of the current church date to the Lusignan period, notably the door with a moulded arch on the north side of building. The marble lintel is carved with a cross in the centre and two shields on each side. One has a rampant lion of the usual Lusignan variety, while the others are probably personal and episcopal in nature. Since the restoration and repair of the church, a contemporary mosaic of Saint Nicholas has been inserted in the tympanum above the lintel, and a portico added across the entire north side of the church.

After the establishment of Ottoman rule, Jacques de Villamont, who visited in 1588, reported the abbey remained almost whole, "having received no injury from the Turks when they took Cyprus from the Venetians in 1570." However, "the cats are dead from want of food but their memory lives in the name Capo delle Gatte." The traveller, humanist and writer Kryštof Harant provided a charming woodcut of the cats and snakes amidst the monastic buildings in his 1608 book Journey from Bohemia to the Holy Land, by way of Venice and the Sea, while de Beauvau, writing in the same period, reported that cats were gone, but that some monks were still resident. The monastery seems to have fallen slowly to ruins over the course of the seventeenth century, such that in the eighteenth century the Metropolitan Bishop Makarios I undertook its restoration. The church as it presently stands probably reflects his work. His attempts to revive the monastery faltered and the management of the monastery was assumed by the Bishopric of Kiti to which the property belonged. Writing in 1918, George H. Everett Jeffery says: "At the present day the monastery ... is a ruin of which only the church and one arcade of the cloister survive in a condition to show the original design." The arcade he mentions is probably that which survived to the 1970s and is now incorporated into the restored cloister.

=== Recent history ===
In 1960, the church of the monastery was repaired, while shortly after 1974 an elderly monk from the Monastery of Apostle Barnabas initiated efforts to revive the Monastery. He died before finishing his work but from 1983, two nuns from Agios Georgios Alamanos resumed the effort. Emulating St. Helena, they decided to keep 100 cats in the monastery. In 1991, on the name day of Agios Nicolaos nun Kassiani was declared abbess. Today, the nunnery is administered by the Bishopric of Lemesos.

=== Literary responses ===
The Nobel laureate Giorgos Seferis wrote a poem about Saint Nicholas of the Cats in 1969, translated into English in 1995. An article by Benjamin Arbel also reflects on the cats and their significance in Renaissance writing.

== 2026 Evacuation ==
In March of 2026, following the strike on Akrotiri and upon receiving credible intelligence from the Cyprus National Guard regarding the threat of follow on strikes, the Cyprus Civil Defence, ordered the evacuation from Akrotiri village with approximately 970 of the 1000 person population leaving. This happened in communication with the SBA administration (Which had already advised and evcuated British civilians to a nearby Cypriot military base) and the Cyprus Ministry of Foreign Affairs.

== Gallery ==
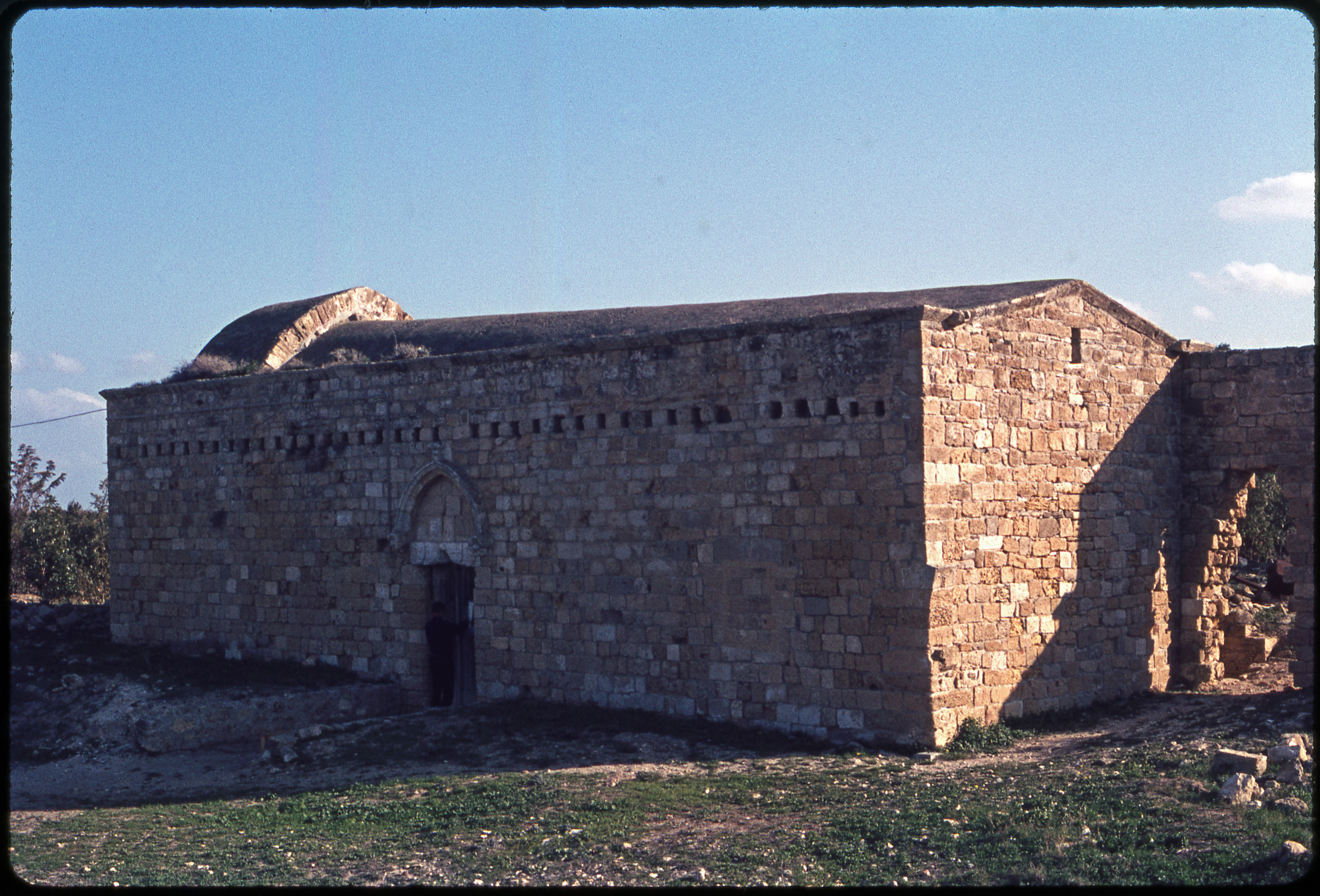
Saint Nicholas of the Cats, church from the NW as it stood in 1973

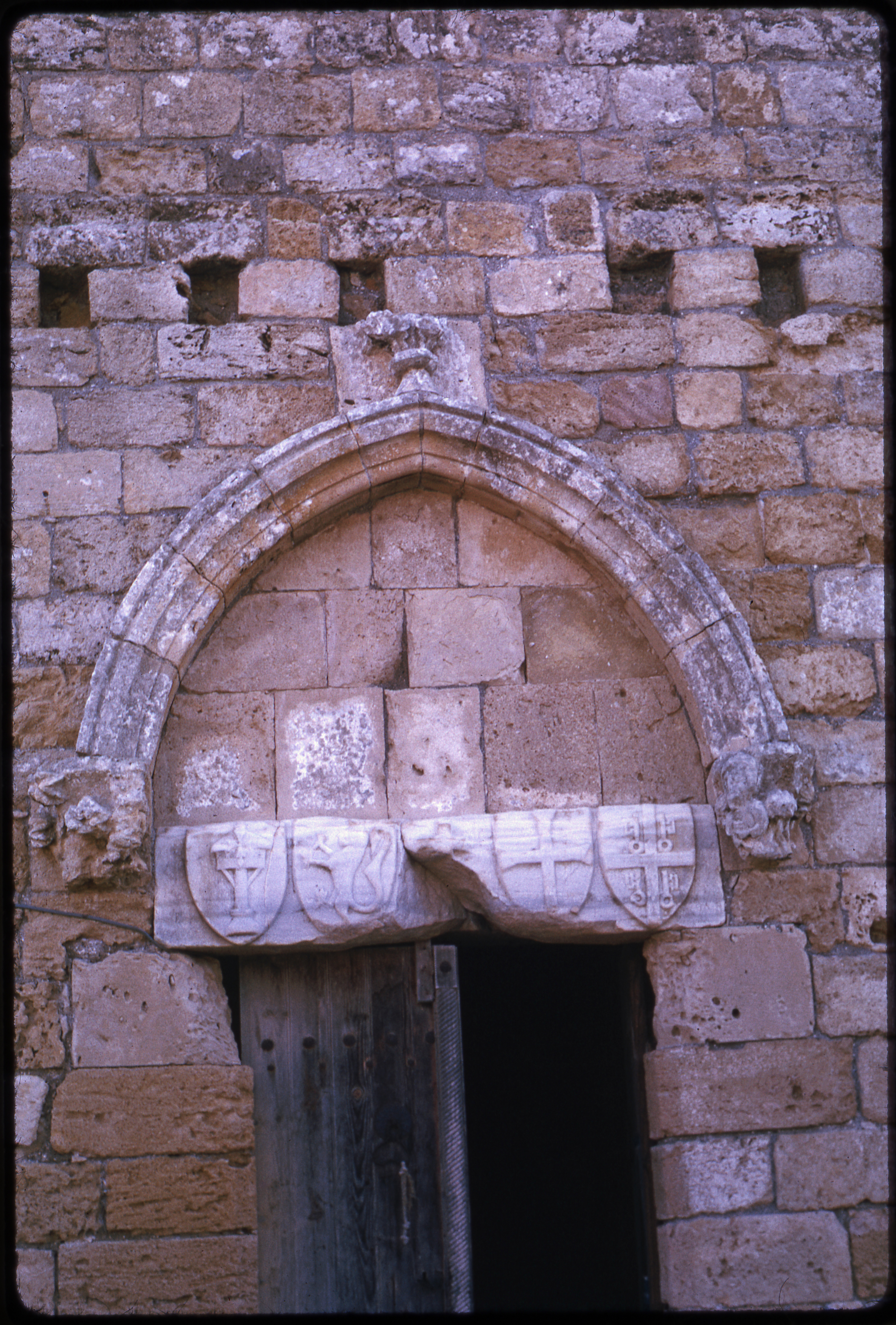
Saint Nicholas of the Cats, door of the church as it stood in 1973

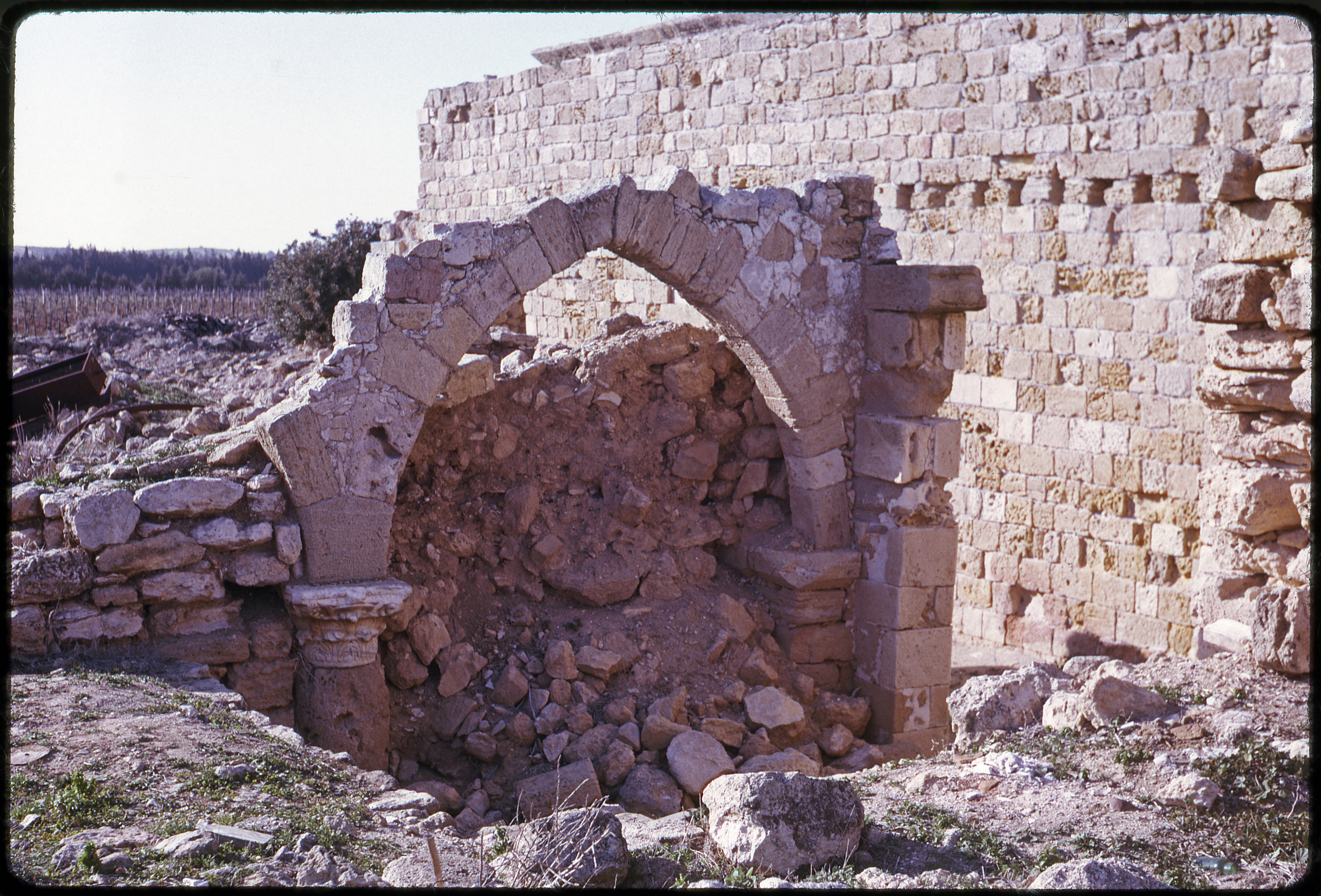
Saint Nicholas of the Cats, arcade of the cloister as it stood in 1973

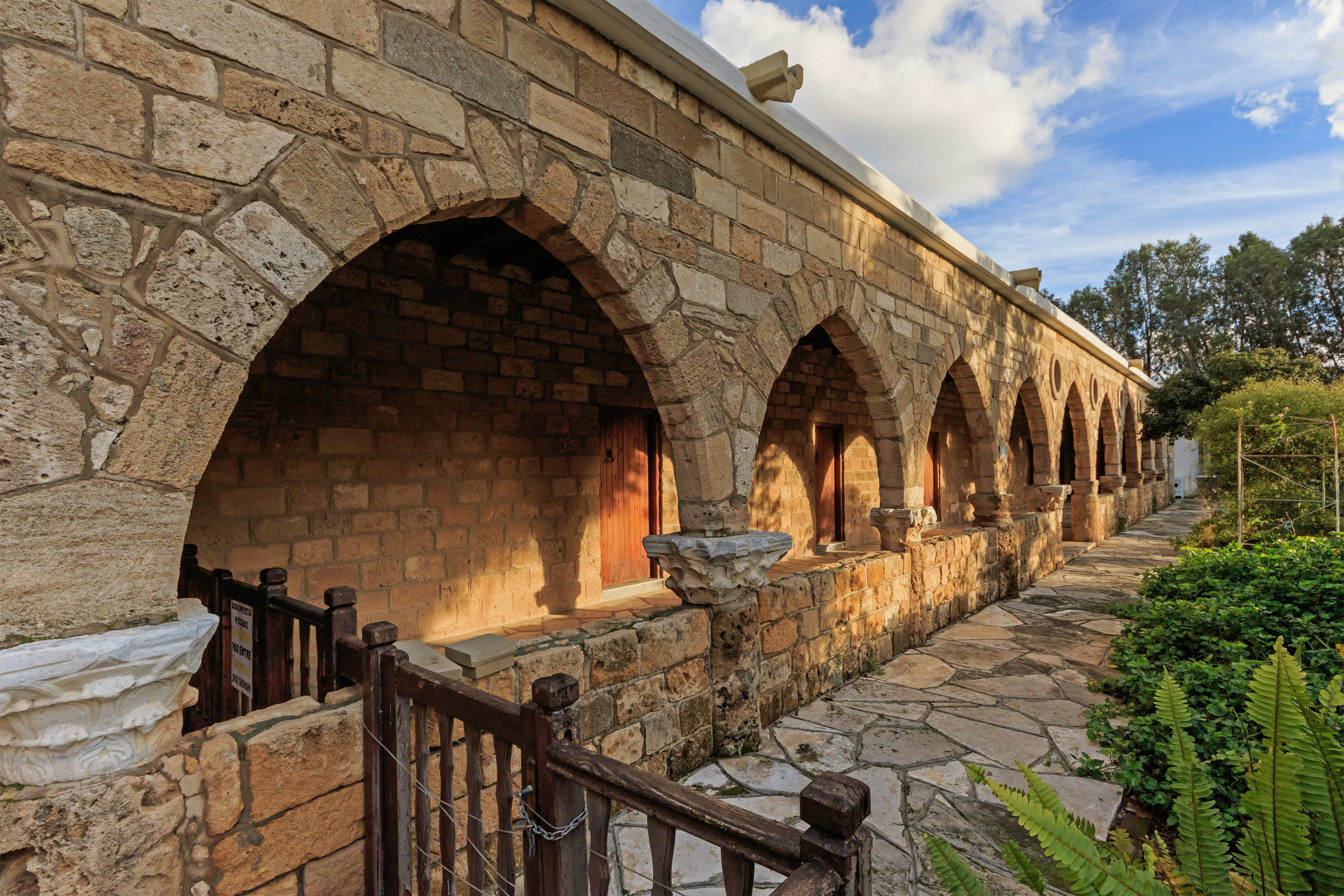
Saint Nicholas of the Cats, cloister, 2017

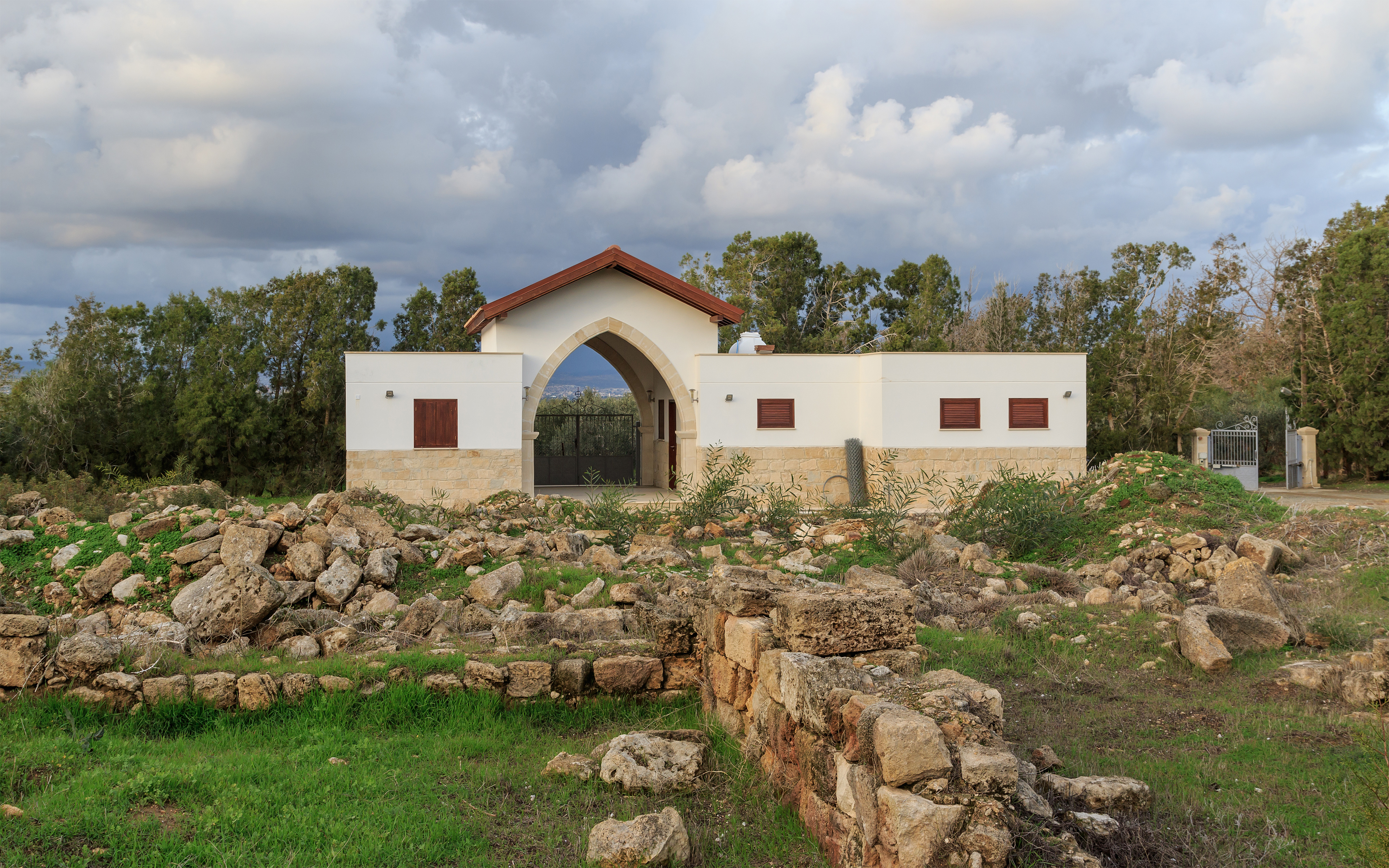
Saint Nicholas of the Cats, gate, 2017
