= Sotira, Trikala =

Sotira Σωτήρα
- Settlement
- Location within Greece
- Coordinates: 39°35′N 21°45′E
- Country: Greece
- Administrative region: Thessaly
- Regional unit: Trikala
- Municipality: Trikala
- Municipal unit: Trikala

Population (2001)
  - Total: 562
- Time zone: UTC+2 (EET)
  - Summer (DST): UTC+3 (EEST)
- Vehicle registration: ΤΚ

Sotira (Greek: Σωτήρα) is a village located 4 km north of Trikala in the southcentral part of the Trikala regional unit, Greece. The settlement, which became part of the municipality of Trikala in 1883, was dissolved in 2011. Sotira had a population of 562 in 2001.

== Population ==
Year	Population
1991	357
2001	562

== See also ==
- List of settlements in the Trikala regional unit
