= Episkopi, Limassol =

Episkopi: Επισκοπή (Greek); Piskobu (Turkish); Yalova
- Village and Municipal district
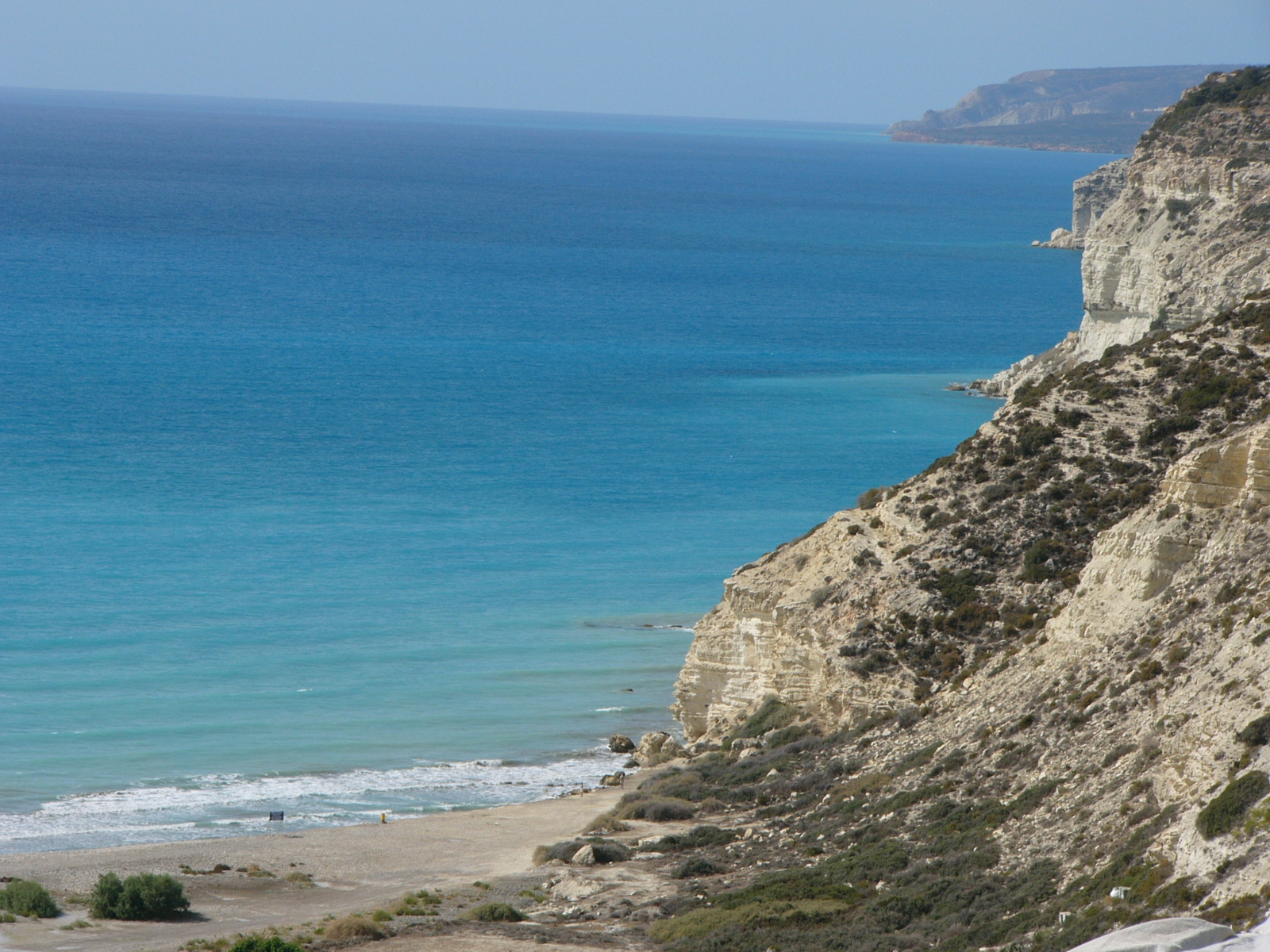
- Episkopi Bay, Cyprus
- Interactive map of Episkopi
- Location within Cyprus Location within the Eastern Mediterranean Location within the European Union Location within Asia
- Coordinates: 34°40′15″N 32°54′7″E
- Country: Cyprus; United Kingdom
- District: Limassol District
- Municipality: Kourion Municipality
- Incorporated into Kourion Municipality: 1 July 2024

Government
  - Body: Municipal Council of Kourion
  - Deputy mayor: Lefkios Prodromou

Area
  - Village: 23.33 km^{2} (9.01 sq mi)

Population (2021)
  - Village: 4,098
  - Density: 175.7/km^{2} (454.9/sq mi)
- Time zone: UTC+2 (EET)
  - Summer (DST): UTC+3 (EEST)
- Website: kourion.org

Episkopi (Greek: Επισκοπή, Turkish: Piskobu) is a village and a municipal district of the Kourion Municipality lying partly in the Limassol District of Cyprus and partly in the British Overseas Territory of Akrotiri and Dhekelia. Its current deputy mayor is Lefkios Prodromou. It is approximately 14 km (9 mi) west of Limassol and 40 km (25 mi) east of Paphos. Episkopi is built on the hill of ancient Kourion, close to the western bank of the Kouris River.

== History ==
In the medieval Kingdom of Cyprus, Episkopi was granted in fief to the House of Ibelin. It was in the hands of Federico Cornaro of the Republic of Venice from 1367 and granted to him in 1374 by the indebted king. It was known as La Piscopia da Cornaro, and the branch of the Cornaro family descended from Federico became known as Cornaro Piscopia. The Cornaros ran a large sugar plantation in their fief near Episkopi that employed slaves of Syrian or Arab origin or local serfs.

Before the 1974 invasion, the village had 3,000 Turkish residents. Later, the majority of them left the village for England.

== Twin towns – sister cities ==
Episkopi is twinned with:

- Argos, Greece
