= Erimi =

Erimi: Ερήμη (Greek); Erimi (Turkish)
- Village and Municipal district
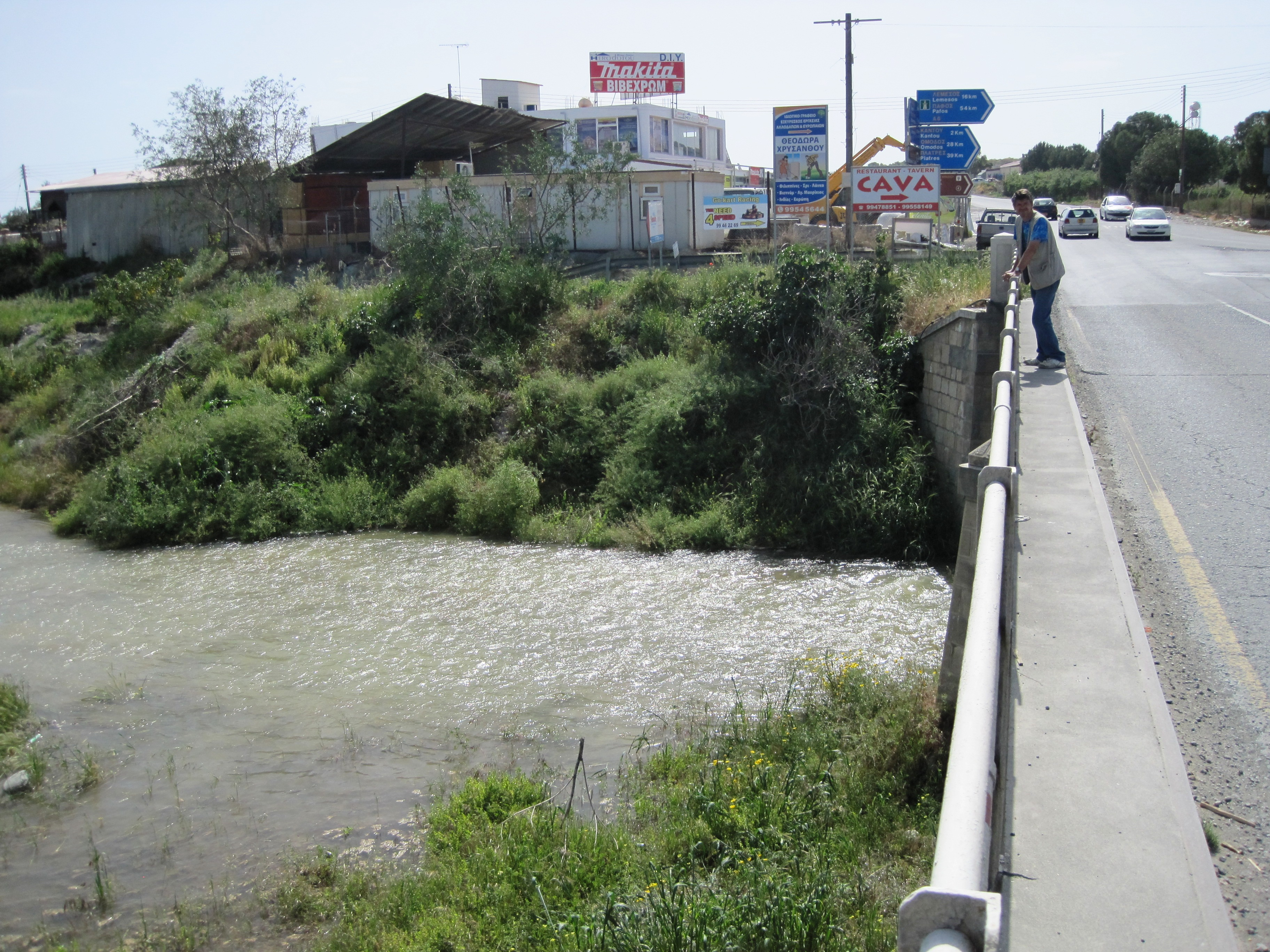
- Kouris River by Erimi Bridge
- Interactive map of Erimi
- Location within Cyprus Location within the Eastern Mediterranean Location within the European Union Location within Asia
- Coordinates: 34°40′48″N 32°55′14″E
- Country: Cyprus
- District: Limassol District
- Municipality: Kourion Municipality
- Incorporated into Kourion Municipality: 1 July 2024

Government
  - Body: Municipal Council of Kourion
  - Deputy mayor: Andreas Aresti

Population (2021)
  - Total: 3,159
- Time zone: UTC+2 (EET)
  - Summer (DST): UTC+3 (EEST)
- Postal code: 4630
- Website: kourion.org

Erimi (Greek: Ερήμη) is a village and a municipal district of the Kourion Municipality, lying partly in the Limassol District of Cyprus and partly in the British Overseas Territory of Akrotiri and Dhekelia. It has a population of 3,159 according to the 2021 census.

Close to Erimi is the village of Kolossi, which is where one can find the castle of Kolossi.

== History and archaeology ==
At Erimi there are a number of important archaeological sites, including the Chalcolithic site of Erimi-Pamboula that was excavated by Porphyrios Dikaios, the Early-Middle Bronze Age site of Erimi-Kafkalla and Erimi-Laonin tou Porakou and the Late Bronze Age site of Erimi-Pitharka.

== Cyprus Wine Museum ==
The Cyprus Wine Museum (Greek: Οινομουσείο) is located in Erimi, on Paphou Street and on the old Limassol-Paphos road, near routes leading towards Kolossi Castle, ancient Kourion and the Sanctuary of Apollo Hylates. It was founded by the composer Anastasia Guy in a traditional stone building that had belonged to her family for generations. According to the museum, Erimi lies at the crossroads of Cyprus's wine routes and has a winemaking history of some 5,500 years.

The museum presents the history of wine production in Cyprus, including its storage, use and trade from antiquity to the present. Exhibits include objects from different periods of Cypriot wine history, photographic and audiovisual material, and displays on indigenous grape varieties and Commandaria, drawn partly from Guy's private collection of jars, vases, medieval drinking vessels, documents and instruments.
