= September 16 (Eastern Orthodox liturgics) =

Day in the Eastern Orthodox liturgical calendar

Eastern Orthodox liturgical calendar
September 15	September 16	September 17
September 16 O.S. ≍ September 29 N.S. September 16 N.S ≍ September 3 O.S.

An Eastern Orthodox cross

September 16 in Eastern Orthodox liturgical calendars is a feast day and a day of commemoration of saints and martyrs. Although some Orthodox churches use the Revised Julian Calendar and others use the traditional Julian calendar, the fixed commemorations for their respective September 16 are broadly the same, no matter which calendar is used. (Note: Despite the dates being the same, the days to which they refer typically differ by 13 days. The notation Old Style or O.S. is sometimes used to indicate a date in the traditional Julian Calendar (the "Old Calendar"). The notation New Style or N.S. indicates a date in the Revised Julian calendar (the "New Calendar").)

== Feasts ==
- Afterfeast of the Exaltation of the Cross.

== Saints ==
- Saint Sebastiana, disciple of Apostle Paul, martyred at Heraclea (86) (Note: "At Heraclea, in Thrace, St. Sebastiana, martyr, under the emperor Domitian and the governor Sergius. Being brought to the faith of Christ by the blessed apostle Paul, she was tormented in various ways and finally beheaded.")
- Saint Melissa of Marcianopolis, Roman missionary born in Gijon, Spain, virgin and martyr (c. 126-157)
- Great-martyr Euphemia the All-praised, of Chalcedon (304) (Note: "At Chalcedon, the birthday of St. Euphemia, virgin and martyr, under the emperor Diocletian and the proconsul Priscus. For faith in our Lord she was subjected to tortures, imprisonment, blows, the torment of the wheel, fire, the crushing weight of stones, the teeth of beasts, scourging with rods, the cutting of sharp saws, burning pans, all of which she survived. But when she was again exposed to the beasts in the amphitheatre, praying to our Lord to receive her spirit, one of the animals having inflicted a bite on her sacred body, whilst the rest licked her feet, she yielded her unspotted soul to God.") (Note: Name days celebrated today include: Euphemia (Εὐφημία).)
- Martyrs Victor and Sosthenes at Chalcedon (c. 304)
- Venerable Dorotheus, hermit of Egypt (4th century)
- New Martyrs Isaac and Joseph, at Karnu, Georgia (808)
- Martyr Ludmilla, grandmother of St. Wenceslaus, Prince of the Czechs (927) (Note: Princess of Bohemia, entrusted with the education of the young prince St Wenceslas, she was the victim of jealousy and was strangled by hired assassins.)

== Pre-Schism Western saints ==
- Saint Cornelius, Pope of Rome (253) (Note: He was much tried by the heresy of Novatianism and his persecutors exiled him to Civita Vecchia where his sufferings probably hastened his death. St Cyprian refers to him as a martyr. His tomb in Lucina in the cemetery of Callistus still exists.)
- Hieromartyr Cyprian, Bishop of Carthage (258) (Note: Thascius Cecilianus Cyprianus was born in North Africa. He became a lawyer, was converted to Orthodoxy and consecrated Bishop of Carthage in 248. He wrote numerous treatises on theological subjects, one of the most important being De Unitate Catholicae Ecclesiae, and wrote numerous letters. He is one of the greatest Fathers of the Church and he was a model of compassion, discretion and pastoral zeal. Cyprian went into hiding during the persecution of Decius but was arrested and beheaded under Valerian.) (see also: August 31 - East)
- Martyrs Lucy and Geminian, a widow and a neophyte martyred together in Rome under Diocletian (c. 300) (Note: "At Rome, the holy martyrs Lucia, noble matron, and Geminian, who were subjected to most grievous afflictions and a long time tortured, by the command of the emperor Diocletian. Finally, being put to the sword, they obtained the glorious victory of martyrdom.") (see also: September 17 - East)
- Martyrs Abundius and Abundantius, and John and Marcianus, in Rome (c. 304) (Note: The first two were martyred in Rome on the Flaminian Way under the Emperor Diocletian who ordered them to be beheaded together with Marcian, a senator, and John, his son, whom Abundius had raised from the dead.) (Note: "Also, at Rome, at a place on the Flaminian road, ten miles from the city, the holy martyrs Abundius, priest, and Abundantius, deacon, whom the emperor Diocletian caused to be struck with the sword, together with Marcian, an illustrious man, and his son John, whom they had raised from the dead.")
- Saint Ninian, Bishop of Whithorn (Candida Casa), Apostle to the Southern Picts (c. 432) (Note: "In Scotland, St. Ninian, bishop and confessor.") (Note: "ST. NINIAN was a native of Britain, but while yet a youth forsook his country and his kindred, and betook himself to Rome. In that city he was thoroughly instructed in the Faith and mysteries of our holy religion, and in course of time consecrated Bishop. Having gained the reputation of a most holy and venerable man, he was sent back to his own country with a special mission to preach to the pagans of the northern parts of the island. His See was established in Galloway, but his apostolate extended to all the Picts who were settled south of the Grampians. There he built a church of stone - a novel sight to the Britons - and dedicated it to St. Martin. Hence the place was called Candida Casa, or Whithern - the White House. In this church the sacred remains of St. Ninian were laid together with those of many other holy men, who, according to St. Bede, repose in the same consecrated earth. Some later writers mention ST. PLEBEIUS as a brother of St. Ninian, and it has been conjectured that he also was buried in the Church of St. Martin.") (see also: August 26)
- Saint Curcodomus, successor of St Humbert as Abbot of Maroilles Abbey near Cambrai in France (c. 680)
- Virgin-martyr Dulcissima, venerated from time immemorial in Sutri in Italy.
- Saint Eugenia, Abbess of Hohenburg Abbey (735) (Note: Daughter of Adalbert, Duke of Alsace in France, she succeeded her aunt, St Ottilia, as Abbess of Hohenburg.)
- Saints Rogelius and Servus-Dei, a monk and his young disciple martyred in Cordoba in Spain for publicly denouncing Islam (852) (Note: "At Cordova, the holy martyrs Rogellus and Servideus, who were decapitated, after their hands and feet had been cut off.")
- Saint Edith of Wilton, Nun, of Wilton Abbey (984) (Note: Daughter of King Edgar and St Wilfrida. She became a nun at Wilton in England at the age of fifteen. She reposed at the age of twenty-two, famous for her generosity to the poor and her familiarity with wild animals.)
- Saint Stephen of Perugia, third Abbot of St Peter in Perugia in Italy (1026)

== Post-Schism Orthodox saints ==
- Venerable Kassianos of Glyfia near Alektora, in Cyprus, ascetic.
- Saint Cyprian, Metropolitan of Moscow and All Russia, Wonderworker (1406)
- Venerable Kuksha (Velichko) of Odessa, Hiero-Schemamonk of Odessa (1964) (see also: December 11 - translation of relics)

=== New martyrs and confessors ===
- New Hieromartyr Gregory (Raevskii) of Tver, Priest (1937)
- New Hieromartyr Sergius Losev, Priest (1942)
- Venerable Confessor Sofian (Boghiu) of Antim (2002)

== Other commemorations ==
- Icon of the Mother of God Support of Humble, near Pskov (1420)
- Translation of the relics (2001) of St. Alexis Mechev of Moscow (1923)

== Icon gallery ==
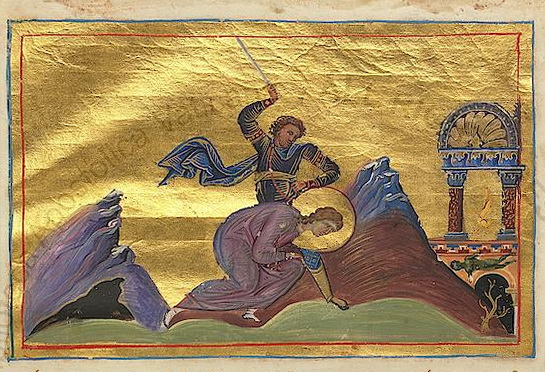
St. Melitina of Marcianopolis.
(Menologion of Basil II, 10th century).

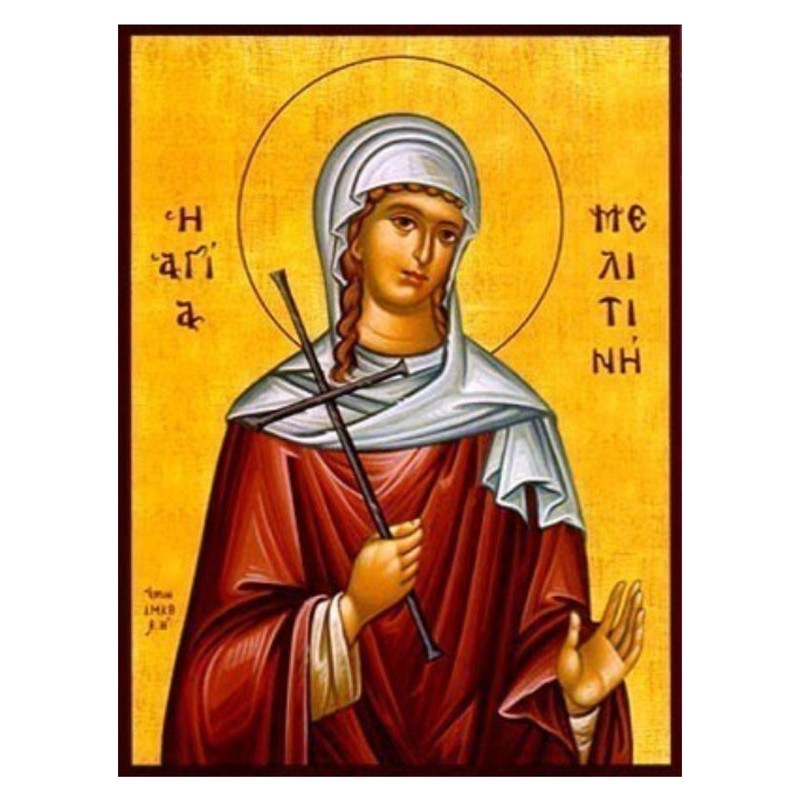
St. Melitina of Marcianopolis.

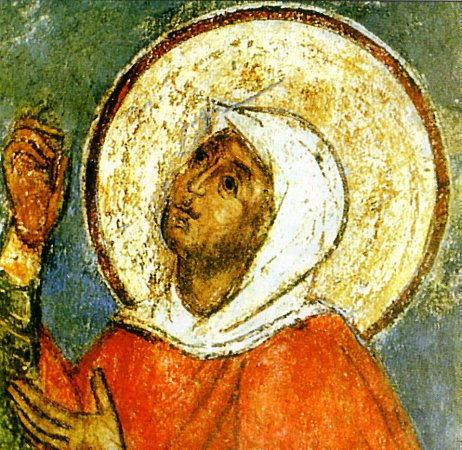
Great-martyr Euphemia the All-praised, of Chalcedon.

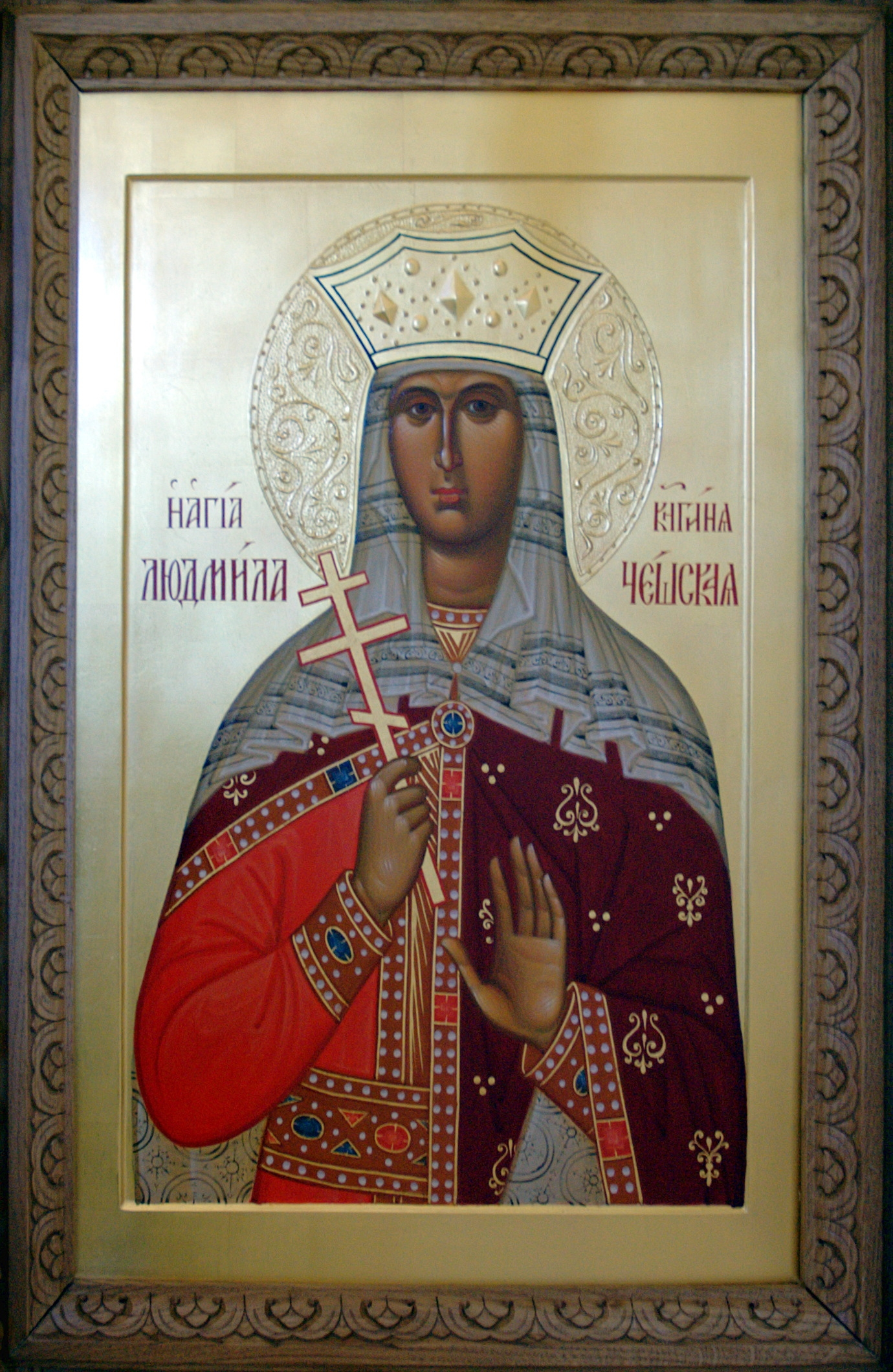
St. Ludmilla of Bohemia.

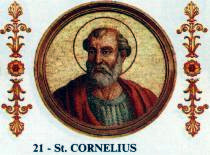
St. Cornelius, Pope of Rome.

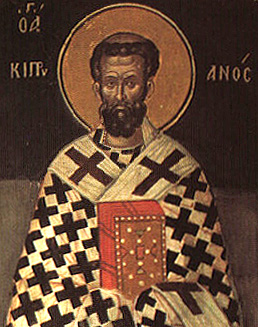
St. Cyprian, Bishop of Carthage.

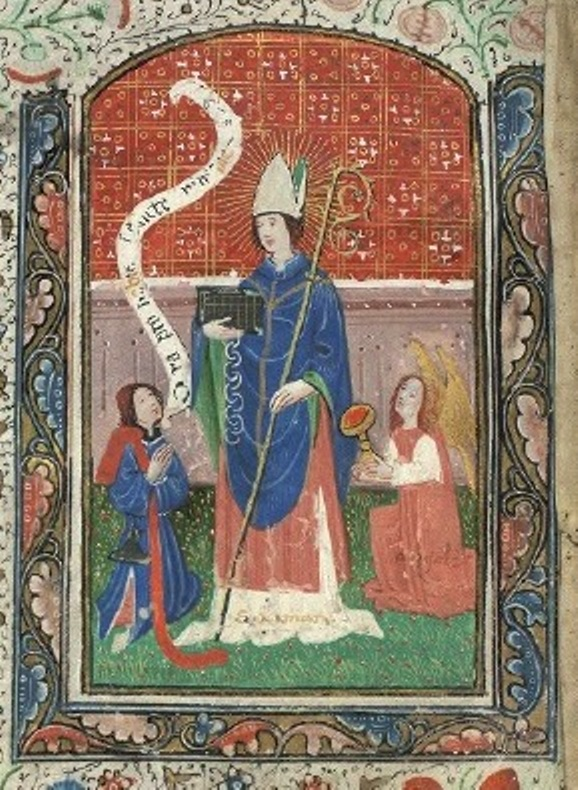
St. Ninian, Bishop of Whithorn.

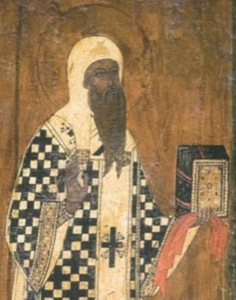
St Cyprian, Metropolitan of Moscow and All Russia, Wonderworker.

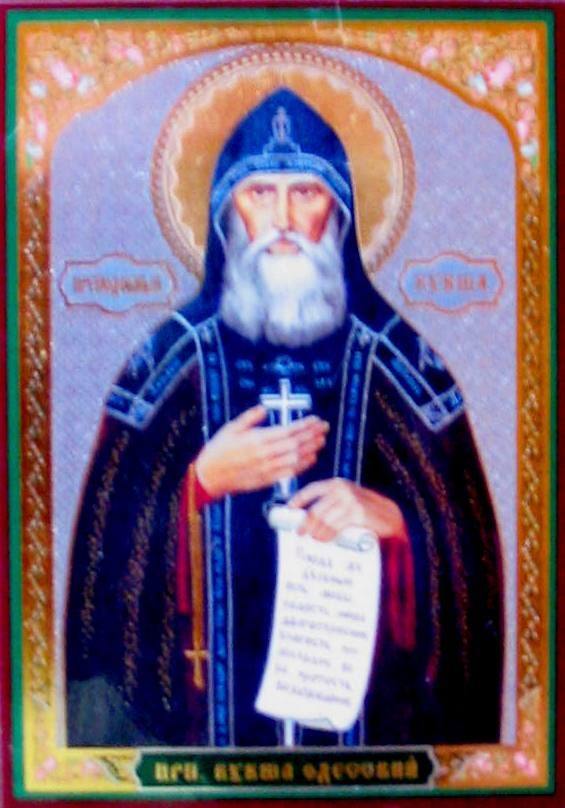
Venerable Kuksha (Velichko) of Odessa, Hiero-Schemamonk of Odessa.

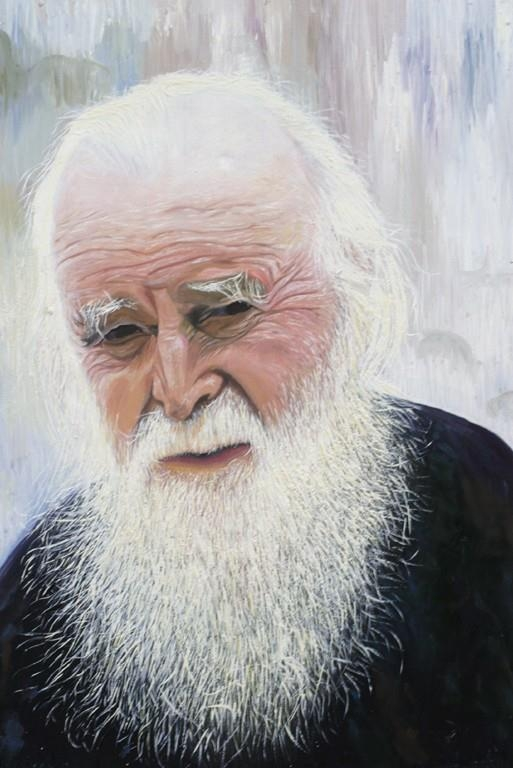
Venerable Confessor Sofian (Boghiu) of Antim.

== Sources ==
- September 29 / September 16. HOLY TRINITY RUSSIAN ORTHODOX CHURCH (A parish of the Patriarchate of Moscow).
- September 16. OCA - The Lives of the Saints.
- The Autonomous Orthodox Metropolia of Western Europe and the Americas (ROCOR). St. Hilarion Calendar of Saints for the year of our Lord 2004. St. Hilarion Press (Austin, TX). p. 69.
- The Sixteenth Day of the Month of September. Orthodoxy in China.
- September 16. Latin Saints of the Orthodox Patriarchate of Rome.
- The Roman Martyrology. Transl. by the Archbishop of Baltimore. Last Edition, According to the Copy Printed at Rome in 1914. Revised Edition, with the Imprimatur of His Eminence Cardinal Gibbons. Baltimore: John Murphy Company, 1916. pp. 285–286.
- Rev. Richard Stanton. A Menology of England and Wales, or, Brief Memorials of the Ancient British and English Saints Arranged According to the Calendar, Together with the Martyrs of the 16th and 17th Centuries. London: Burns & Oates, 1892. p. 448-451.

Greek Sources

- Great Synaxaristes: (in Greek) 16 ΣΕΠΤΕΜΒΡΙΟΥ. ΜΕΓΑΣ ΣΥΝΑΞΑΡΙΣΤΗΣ.
- (in Greek) Συναξαριστής. 16 Σεπτεμβρίου. ECCLESIA.GR. (H ΕΚΚΛΗΣΙΑ ΤΗΣ ΕΛΛΑΔΟΣ).
- (in Greek) 16/09/2026. Ορθόδοξος Συναξαριστής.

Russian Sources

- (in Russian) 29 сентября (16 сентября). Православная Энциклопедия под редакцией Патриарха Московского и всея Руси Кирилла (электронная версия). (Orthodox Encyclopedia - Pravenc.ru).
- (in Russian) 16 сентября по старому стилю / 29 сентября по новому стилю. Русская Православная Церковь - Православный церковный календарь на 2026 год.
