= Mamilian =

Mamilian may refer to:

- Mamilian of Palermo, 5th-century saint
- Maximilian of Tebessa, 3rd-century saint
