= September 15 (Eastern Orthodox liturgics) =

Day in the Eastern Orthodox liturgical calendar

Eastern Orthodox liturgical calendar
September 14	September 15	September 16
September 15 O.S. ≍ September 28 N.S. September 15 N.S ≍ September 2 O.S.

An Eastern Orthodox cross

September 15 in Eastern Orthodox liturgical calendars is a feast day and a day of commemoration of saints and martyrs. Although some Orthodox churches use the Revised Julian Calendar and others use the traditional Julian calendar, the fixed commemorations for their respective September 15 are broadly the same, no matter which calendar is used. (Note: Despite the dates being the same, the days to which they refer typically differ by 13 days. The notation Old Style or O.S. is sometimes used to indicate a date in the traditional Julian Calendar (the "Old Calendar"). The notation New Style or N.S. indicates a date in the Revised Julian calendar (the "New Calendar").)

== Feasts ==
- Afterfeast of the Exaltation of the Cross.

== Saints ==
- Martyrs Maximus, Theodotus, and Asclepiodota, of Adrianopolis (305-311) (see also: September 17)
- Holy Two Virgin-Martyrs, by the sword.
- Martyr Porphyrius the Mime, of Caesarea (361) (Note: "Also, St. Porphyrius, a comedian, who, in the presence of Julian the Apostate, being baptized in jest, and suddenly converted by the power of God, declared himself a Christian. Forthwith, by order of the emperor, he was struck with an axe, and thus crowned with martyrdom.") (see also: November 4)
- Great-martyr Nicetas the Goth and those with him (372) (Note: "The same day, St. Nicetas, a Goth, who was burned alive for the Catholic faith, by order of king Athanaric.") (Note: Name days celebrated today include: Nicetas, Nikita (Νικήτας).)
- Saint Joseph, Abbot of Alaverdi Monastery in Georgia (570)
- Venerable Philotheos the Presbyter of Asia Minor, Wonderworker (10th century)
- Venerable Sabinus, a bishop who became a monastic.

== Pre-Schism Western saints ==
- Saint Nicomedes, by tradition he was a priest martyred in Rome, perhaps under Domitian (c. 90) (Note: "At Rome, on the Nomentan road, the birthday of blessed Nicomedes, priest and martyr. As he said to those who would compel him to sacrifice: "I sacrifice only to the Omnipotent God who reigns in heaven," he was for a long time scourged with leaded whips, and thus went to our Lord.")
- Saint Valerian, a companion of St Pothinus (Photinus) of Lyon in France (178) (Note: He succeeded in escaping from prison and reappeared at Tournus near Autun, where he again preached to the people. He was captured a second time and beheaded.) (Note: "In the diocese of Chalons, St. Valerian, martyr, who was suspended on high by the governor Priscus, and tortured with iron hooks. Remaining immovable in the confession of Christ, and continuing joyfully to praise Him, he was struck with the sword by order of the same magistrate.")
- Saint Alpinus (Aubin, Alpin), Bishop of Lyon (c. 390) (Note: The successor of St Justus in Lyon in France between 381 and 390. He is said to have built the church of St Stephen and chosen it for his Cathedral.)
- Saint Mamilian of Palermo, Bishop of Palermo in Sicily (460) (Note: He was exiled to Tuscany by the Arian King Genseric. His relics were eventually returned to Palermo.)
- Saint Aprus (Aper, Apre, Epvre, Evre), Bishop of Toul (507) (Note: Born near Trier in Germany, he became a very able and just lawyer. He gave up this profession to become a priest and in time became Bishop of Toul in France.)
- Saint Leobinus (Lubin), Abbot of Brou, then Bishop of Chartres (c. 556) (Note: Born near Poitiers in France, he was the son of a peasant. Early in life he became a hermit, then a priest, Abbot of Brou and finally Bishop of Chartres.)
- Saint Hernin (Hernan), a hermit in Brittany at a place called Loc-Harn after him (6th century) (Note: "ST. HERNIN was one of the many Christians of Great Britain who took refuge in Brittany during the sixth century. He led a life of solitude entirely hidden from the world, but the miracles wrought at his tomb revealed his sanctity, and gained the veneration of the neighbouring population. A church was built over his sepulchre which still remains, and is known as Loc-Harn. Many relics of the Saint are preserved there and held in due reverence.")
- Saint Merinus (Merin, Merryn, Meadhran), abbot of Paisley Abbey (c. 620) (Note: A disciple of St Comgall at Bangor Abbey in Ireland.)
- Saint Aichardus (Aicard, Achard), Abbot of St Benedict's at Quinçay near Poitiers, then Abbot of Jumièges (c. 687) (Note: Born in Poitiers in France, the son of an officer at the court of Clotaire II, early in life he became a monk at Ansion in Poitou. Here he spent thirty-nine years, later becoming Abbot of St Benedict's at Quinçay near Poitiers. Finally he succeeded St Philibert as Abbot of Jumièges, where there were nearly one thousand monks.)
- Saint Ritbert, monk and abbot of a small monastery in Varennes in France (c. 690)
- Saint Ribert, Monk and Abbot of Saint-Valèry-sur-Somme in France (7th century) (Note: He may also have been a bishop in Normandy and Picardy. He is the patron of several churches near Rouen.)
- Saints Emilas and Jeremiah, two young men, the former of whom was a deacon, imprisoned and beheaded in Cordoba in Spain under the Caliph Abderrahman (852) (Note: "At Cordova, the holy martyrs Emilas, deacon, and Jeremias, who ended their martyrdom in the persecution of the Arabs by being beheaded, after a long detention in prison.")

== Post-Schism Orthodox saints ==
- Venerable Meletios, founder of the Monastery of Sergius. (Note: His memory is preserved in the Siniaitic Typikon (No. 1094, p. 35) as follows: «Μηνὶ Σεπτεμβρίω ιε’, ἐκοιμήθη ὁ Ὅσιος πατὴρ ἡμῶν Μελέτιος καὶ κτήτωρ τῆς Μονῆς τοῦ Σεργίου».; See Dimitrievski, Typikon II, p. 30.)
- Venerable Nicetas, Bishop of Chytri, near Kythrea, in Cyprus. (Note: His memory is referenced in John Hackett's A History of the Orthodox Church of Cyprus (1901).)
- Saint Symeon of Thessaloniki, Archbishop of Thessaloniki (1429)
- Saint Nicetas, disciple of St. Sergius of Radonezh and founder of the Theophany Monastery in Kostroma (15th century)
- Saints Bessarion I (1490-1499) and Bessarion II (1527-1540), Metropolitans of Larissa. (Note: Name days celebrated today include: Bessarion (Βησσαρίων).) (Note: See: (in Greek) Βησσαρίων Λαρίσης. Βικιπαίδεια. (Greek Wikipedia).)
- Saint Joseph the New of Partoёs, Metropolitan of Timișoara, Romania (1656)
- Saint Gerasimos the New, founder of the sacred monastery of the Holy Trinity in Sourvia, near Makrinitsa (c. 1740)
- New Martyr John of Crete, at New Ephesus (1811)

=== New martyrs and confessors ===
- New Hieromartyr John Ilinsky, Priest (1918)
- Virgin-martyr Eudokia Tkachenko (1918)
- New Hieromartyrs Andrew Kovalev, Gregory Konokotin, Gregory Troitsky, and John Yakovlev, Priests (1921)
- Venerable New Hiero-confessor Ignatius (Biryukov), Archimandrite, of the Aleksievo-Akatov Monastery in Voronezh (1932)
- New Hieromartyr Demetrius Ignatenko, Priest (1935)
- New Hieromartyrs John Borozdin, Jacob Leonovich, Peter Petrikov, and Nicholas Skvortsov, Priests (1937)
- New Hieromartyr Nicholas Tsvetkov, Deacon (1937)
- Martyrs Mary Rykov and Ludmila Petrov (1937)

== Other commemorations ==
- Uncovering of the relics of St. Acacius the Confessor, bishop of Melitene in Pisidia (251) (Note: His feast day is on March 31.)
- Icon of the Mother of God of Novonikita, carried by St Nicetas the Goth (372).
- Uncovering of the relics of Protomartyr and Archdeacon Stephen (415)

== Icon gallery ==
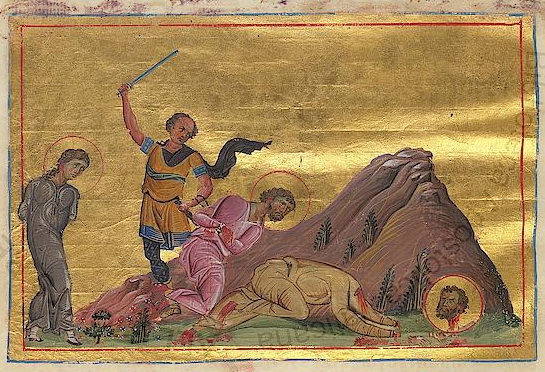
Martyrs Maximus, Theodotus, and Asclepiodota, of Adrianopolis.
(Menologion of Basil II, 10th century).

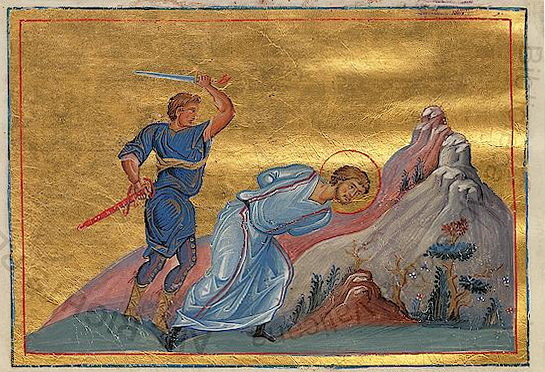
St. Porphyrius the Mime, of Caesarea.
(Menologion of Basil II, 10th century).

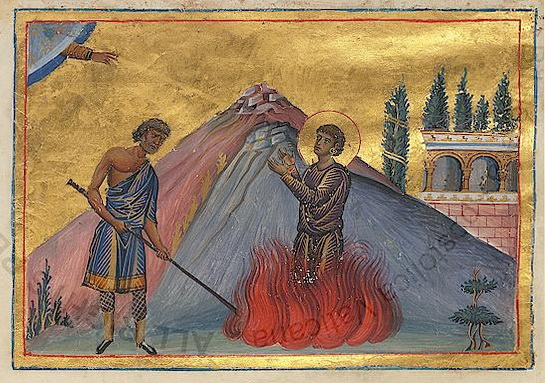
Great-martyr Nicetas the Goth.
(Menologion of Basil II, 10th century).

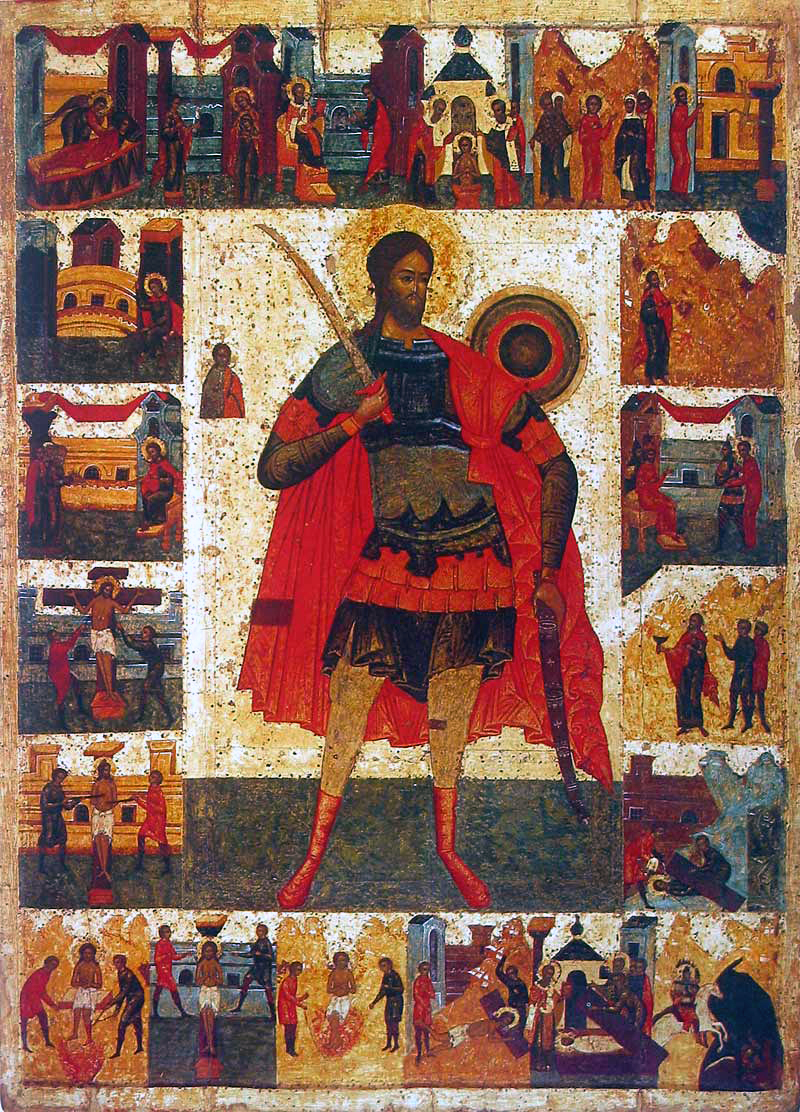
Great-martyr Nicetas the Goth.

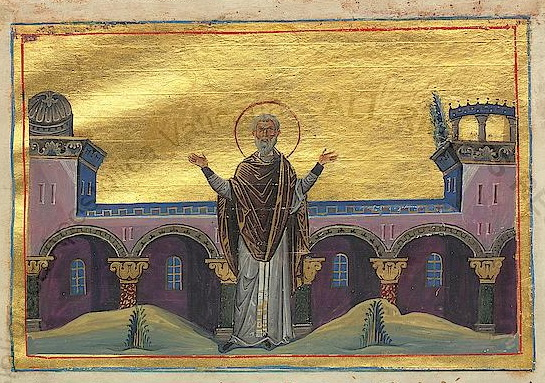
St. Philotheos the Presbyter of Asia Minor, Wonderworker.
(Menologion of Basil II, 10th century).

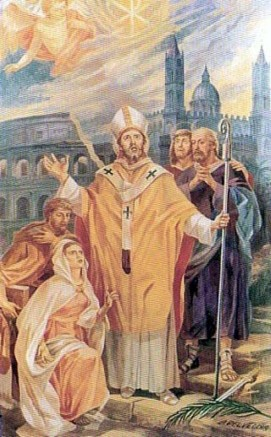
St. Mamilian of Palermo, Bishop of Palermo.

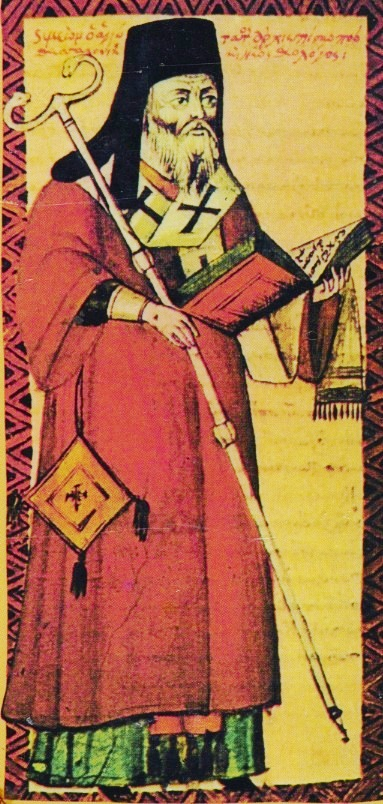
St. Symeon of Thessaloniki, Archbishop of Thessaloniki.

== Sources ==
- September 15/September 28. Orthodox Calendar (PRAVOSLAVIE.RU).
- September 28 / September 15. HOLY TRINITY RUSSIAN ORTHODOX CHURCH (A parish of the Patriarchate of Moscow).
- September 15. OCA - The Lives of the Saints.
- The Autonomous Orthodox Metropolia of Western Europe and the Americas (ROCOR). St. Hilarion Calendar of Saints for the year of our Lord 2004. St. Hilarion Press (Austin, TX). p. 69.
- The Fifteenth Day of the Month of September. Orthodoxy in China.
- September 15. Latin Saints of the Orthodox Patriarchate of Rome.
- The Roman Martyrology. Transl. by the Archbishop of Baltimore. Last Edition, According to the Copy Printed at Rome in 1914. Revised Edition, with the Imprimatur of His Eminence Cardinal Gibbons. Baltimore: John Murphy Company, 1916. pp. 283–285.
- Rev. Richard Stanton. A Menology of England and Wales, or, Brief Memorials of the Ancient British and English Saints Arranged According to the Calendar, Together with the Martyrs of the 16th and 17th Centuries. London: Burns & Oates, 1892. p. 448.

Greek Sources

- Great Synaxaristes: (in Greek) 15 ΣΕΠΤΕΜΒΡΙΟΥ. ΜΕΓΑΣ ΣΥΝΑΞΑΡΙΣΤΗΣ.
- (in Greek) Συναξαριστής. 15 Σεπτεμβρίου. ECCLESIA.GR. (H ΕΚΚΛΗΣΙΑ ΤΗΣ ΕΛΛΑΔΟΣ).
- (in Greek) 15/09/2026. Ορθόδοξος Συναξαριστής.

Russian Sources

- (in Russian) 28 сентября (15 сентября). Православная Энциклопедия под редакцией Патриарха Московского и всея Руси Кирилла (электронная версия). (Orthodox Encyclopedia - Pravenc.ru).
- (in Russian) 15 сентября по старому стилю / 28 сентября по новому стилю. Русская Православная Церковь - Православный церковный календарь на 2026 год.
