= Cuconeștii Noi =

- Commune
- Location in Moldova
- Coordinates: 47°59′N 27°12′E
- Country: Moldova
- District: Edineț District

Population (2014)
  - Total: 1,869
- Time zone: UTC+2 (EET)
  - Summer (DST): UTC+3 (EEST)

Cuconeștii Noi is a commune in Edineț District, Moldova. It is composed of two villages, Cuconeștii Noi and Cuconeștii Vechi (depopulated as of 2014).

== Notable people ==
- Sofian Boghiu (1912–2002), Orthodox hieromonk, iconographer and confessor
