= Melissa of Marcianopolis =

2nd-century Christian martyr and saint

Saint Melissa
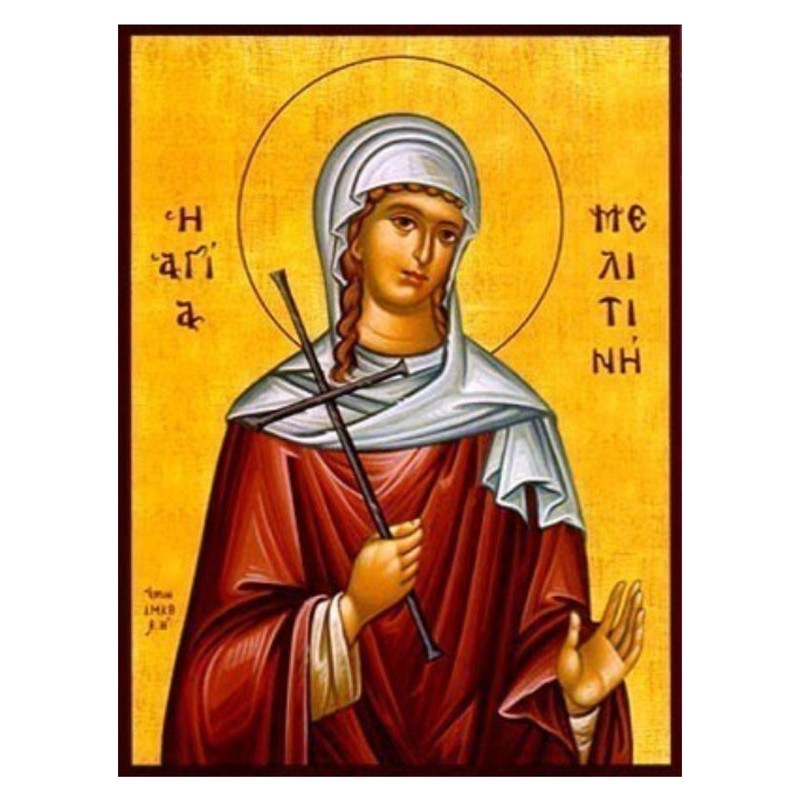
- An icon of Saint Melissa of Marcianopolis

Virgin and Martyr
- Born: Melissae, Melitinḗ or Melitina; 28 February 126; Gijon, Hispania, Roman Empire
- Died: 16 September 157; Marcianopolis, Thrace, Roman Empire
- Cause of death: Decapitation
- Venerated in: Catholic Church; Eastern Orthodox Church; Oriental Orthodox Churches
- Canonized: Pre-Congregation
- Feast: 16 September (Catholic and Eastern Orthodoxy); 30 November (Catholic in Spain); 29 October (In Greece — Greek Orthodox Church); 29 September (Oriental Orthodoxy); 6 Thout (Coptic); 19 April (Synaxis — Byzantine); 14 October (Ethiopian Orthodox Church)
- Attributes: Cross or Crucifix, Mantle, Wreath of Flowers and Palm branch
- Patronage: Missionaries; teenagers; against fanaticism; persecution of Christianity; martyrs; resentment; hatred; narcissism; headaches; possessed people and the excluded; Brescia, Italy; Lemnos, Greece; Devnya, Bulgary;

Melissa (Melissae or Melitine or Melitinḗ or Melitina; 28 February, 126 – 16 September, 157) was a virgin and martyr in 2nd-century Christian traditions, venerated as a saint.

According to legend, she was a missionary and nun from the Hispania and lived in Marcianople with the mission of evangelizing other peoples. At the same time, Thrace, the region in which the city was located, was controlled by governor Antiochus. She was martyred by him during the persecution of Emperor Antoninus Pius.

Her liturgical feast is celebrated on 16 September .

== Life ==
Melissa, a devout Christian originally from the Gijon, Asturias region of Spain, was sent as a missionary and nun to Thrace during the reign of Antoninus Pius. There, under the rule of the persecutor Antiochus, her preaching led to the conversion of many pagans, which resulted in her arrest. Gifted with miraculous gifts, she destroyed the idols of Apollo and Hercules, causing scandal among the Gentiles and aggravating the ire of the authorities. Refusing to renounce her Christian faith, she was entrusted to Antiochus' wife and a group of influential women who attempted, in vain, to persuade her to abandon her faith.

The attempt to persuade her to renounce her faith failed. Melissa resisted all pressure and succeeded in converting Antiochus' wife and other women in the pagan circle. The woman charged with leading her to idolatry also converted to Christianity. Together, they began to evangelize in secret, facing the constant threat of persecution.

When Antiochus discovered his wife's conversion, he became furious and ordered their immediate execution. Melissa and the governor's wife were beheaded, sealing their testimony of faith with martyrdom. Melissa faced death with unwavering courage, as one walking toward glory, receiving the eternal crown reserved for holy martyrs.

Some time later, a Macedonian Christian named Acacius, passing through Marcianopolis on his way back to his homeland, learned that the sacred relics of Saint Melissa still lay unburied. Moved by piety and zeal, he approached the governor and asked permission to take the saint's body with him for a dignified burial in his region. Antiochus, unaware of Acacius's true intention, granted him permission.

Acacius carefully placed the mortal remains of Saint Melissa in a chest and immediately set sail. However, during the voyage she became gravely ill and died. The ship landed on a promontory on the island of Lemnos, and there, in accordance with the deceased's wishes, her traveling companions buried the relics of the holy martyr. Acacius himself, who had shown such love and reverence for Christ's martyrs, was buried next to the tomb of Saint Melissa.

The memory of Saints Melissa and Acacius lives on in Christian tradition as an example of fidelity, apostolic zeal, and unwavering devotion. Their story represents not only the triumph of faith over persecution, but also the power of the evangelical truth, capable of transforming hearts even within the pagan power structures of the Roman Empire.
