= Curcodomus =

Saint Curcodomus
- Died: ca. 680 AD
- Venerated in: Roman Catholic Church
- Feast: September 16

Saint Curcodomus (died ca. 680) was a Benedictine abbot and saint. He succeeded Saint Humbert at Maroilles Abbey.
