= Maroilles Abbey =

Abbey in Nord, France

Coordinates: 50°8′0″N 3°45′31″E

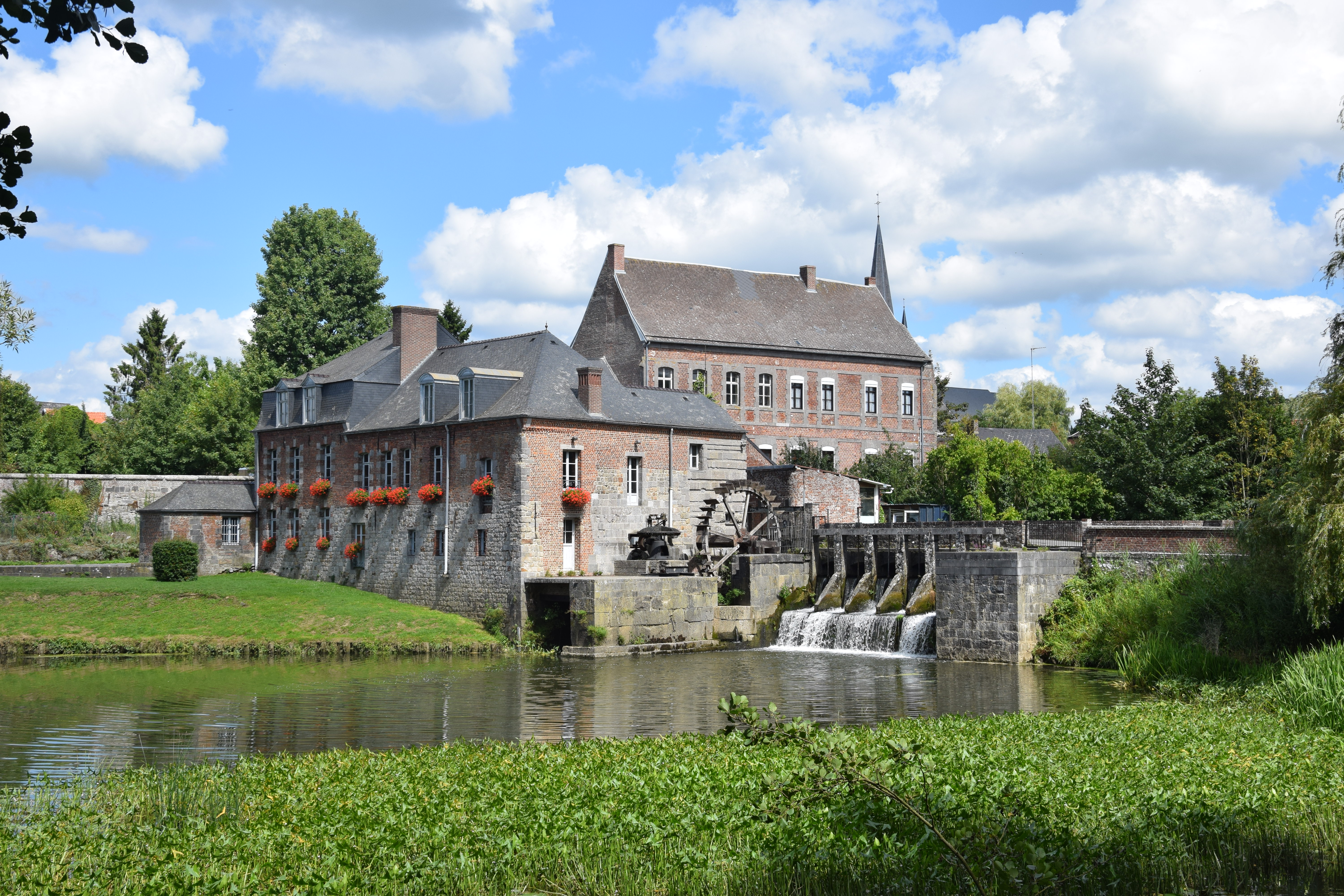
Maroilles Abbey

Maroilles Abbey (French: Abbaye de Maroilles) was a Benedictine monastery in Maroilles in the department of Nord, France. It was founded around 650 and suppressed in the French Revolution.

== History ==
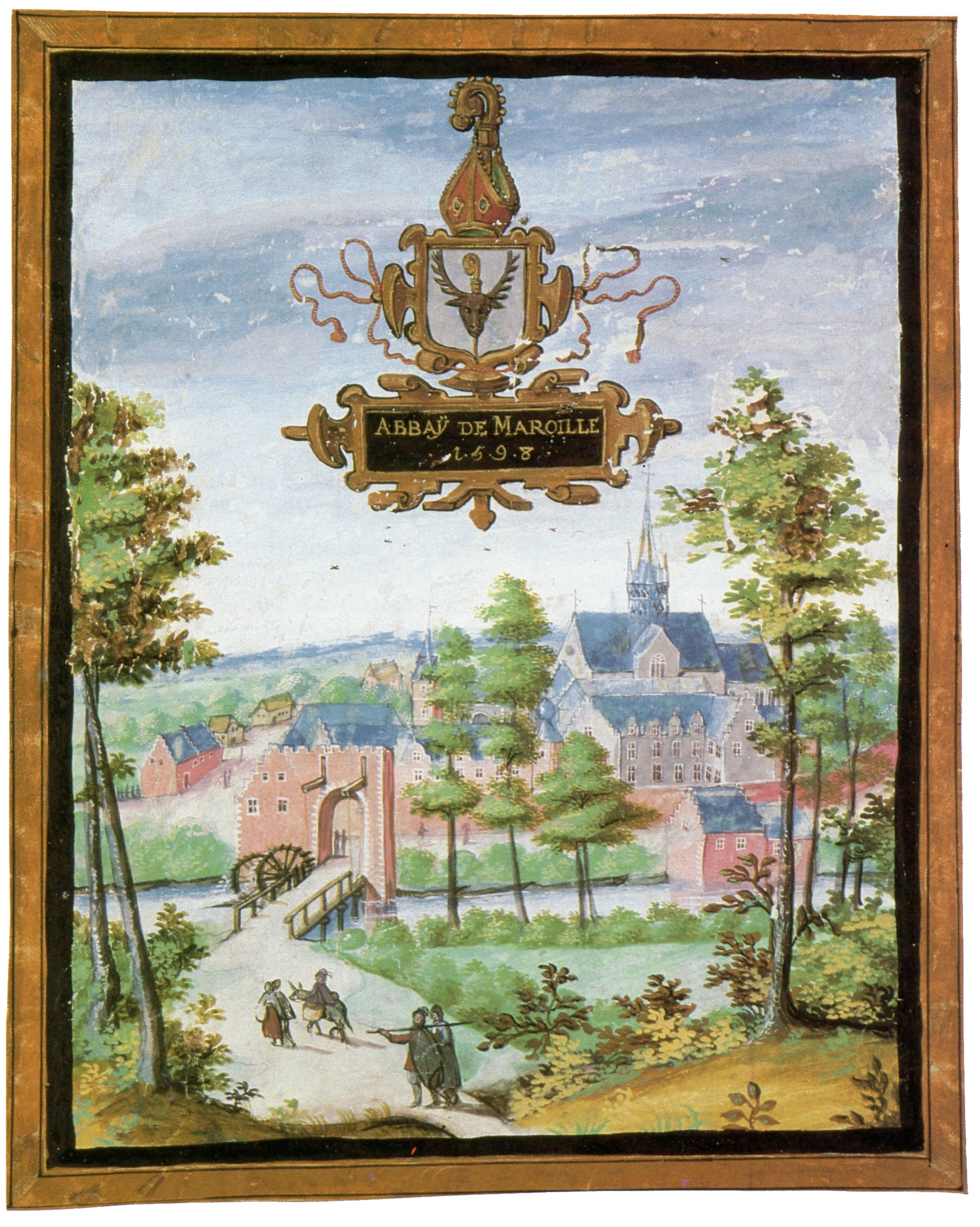
Maroilles Abbey in 1598. Albums of Croÿ.

The abbey was founded by Count Chonebert (or Radobert). Its first abbot was Saint Humbert of Maroilles. He returned from a trip to Rome with relics and a statuette of the Virgin Mary, whom he named patroness of the abbey church under the title Maroilles Notre Dame des Affligés. Humbert was succeeded by Saint Curcodomus. From the 9th century to the time of the French Revolution in the late 18th century, the abbey followed the Rule of St. Benedict.

The abbey was repaired and restored in 1025 by Gerard of Florennes (Gérard de Cambrai) after the Norman invasions. It suffered damage in the 14th and 15th centuries in wars involving the County of Hainaut. Reconstruction projects took place during the 16th and 18th centuries. The abbey reached its peak in terms of power and wealth during the 18th century.

=== During French Revolution ===
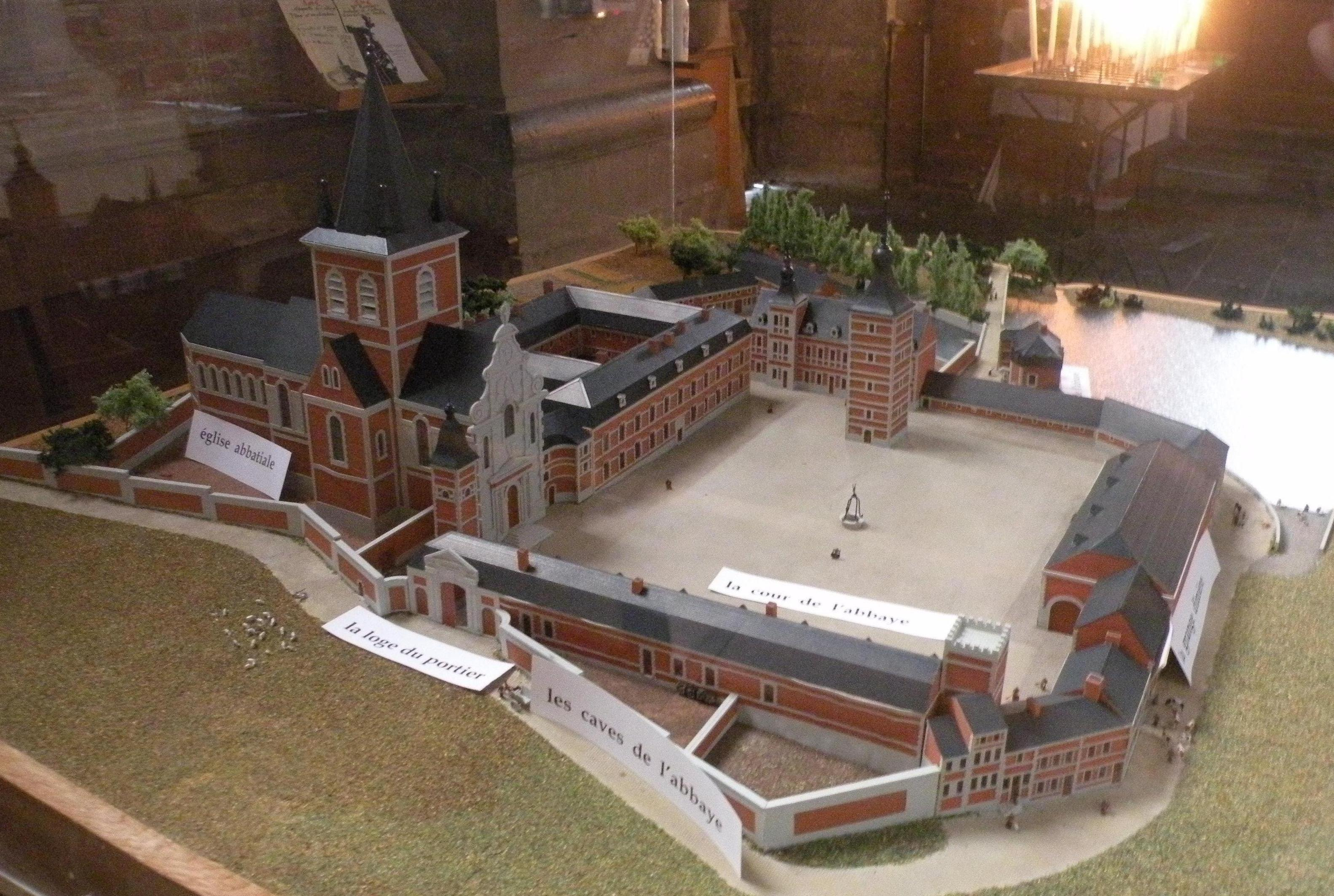
Model of Maroilles Abbey

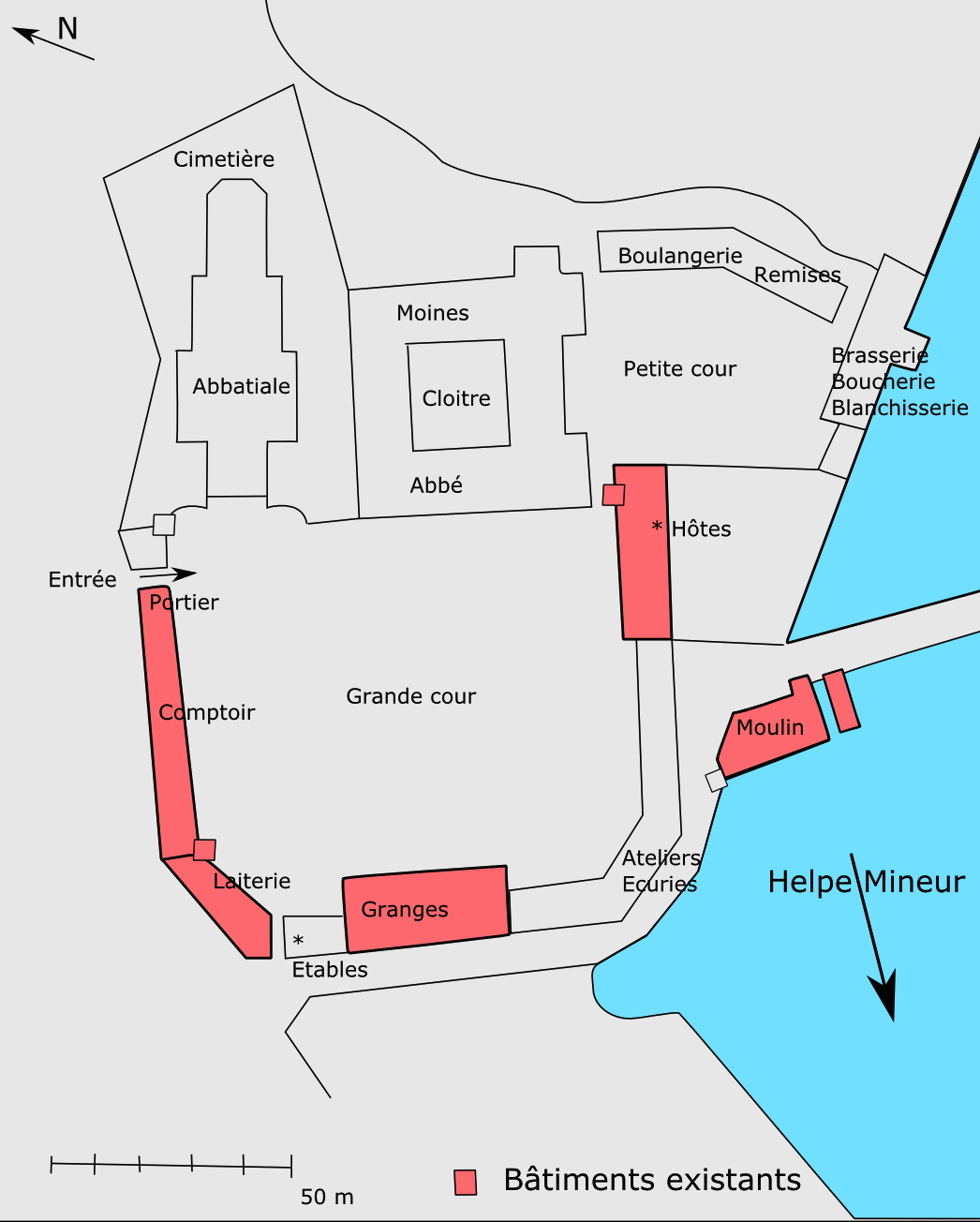
Plan of the abbey

During the French Revolution, on July 28, 1789, the wealth and power of the abbey caused it to become a target of anger, and it was sacked by the villagers of Taisnières-en-Thiérache.

Between 1791 and 1794, the abbey was used as a quarry, and the abbey church, the cloister, and some of the walls disappeared. Today only parts of the portal and guesthouse remain, as well as the windmill and tithe barn (grange dimière).

The tithe barn has been restored and converted into a tourism and information center, providing information on the natural and cultural patrimony of the local region.

== Maroilles cheese ==
Maroilles cheese is often reported to have first been made in 962 by a monk in Maroilles Abbey.
