= Sofian Boghiu =

Romanian Orthodox hieromonk, iconographer and confessor

Saint Sofian Boghiu
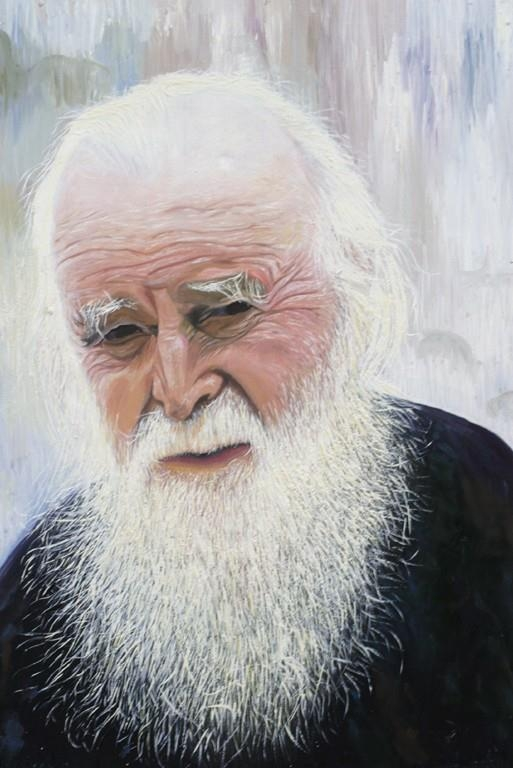
- 1999 portrait of Boghiu by Paul Mecet

Venerable, confessor, hieromonk
- Born: Serghei Boghiu; 7 October 1912; Cuconeștii Vechi, Bălți County, Bessarabia (now Moldova)
- Died: 14 September 2002 (aged 89); Antim Monastery, Bucharest, Romania
- Venerated in: Romanian Orthodox Church
- Canonized: 11–12 July 2024 (Holy Synod decision); 4 February 2025 (general proclamation); 16 September 2025 (local proclamation), Bucharest, Romania by Holy Synod of the Romanian Orthodox Church
- Feast: 16 September

Sofian Boghiu (born Serghei Boghiu; 7 October 1912 – 14 September 2002) was a Romanian Orthodox hieromonk, church painter, confessor and spiritual father associated above all with Antim Monastery in Bucharest. Formed in the hesychast circle known as the “Burning Bush” (Romanian: Rugul Aprins), he was arrested by the communist authorities in 1958 and sentenced to 15 years’ imprisonment, of which he served about six years in prisons and labor camps.

After his release he returned to Antim Monastery, where he served as abbot and spiritual father, became widely sought as a confessor, and carried out iconography projects in Romania, Lebanon and Syria. He was known in Romanian church literature under the sobriquet “Apostle of Bucharest” (Romanian: Apostolul Bucureștilor) on account of his long pastoral activity in the capital.

In July 2024 the Holy Synod of the Romanian Orthodox Church decided to inscribe him among the saints, assigning his feast day to 16 September. The general proclamation of his canonization took place in Bucharest in February 2025, with a local proclamation at Antim Monastery in September 2025. According to the Basilica News Agency he is regarded within the Romanian Orthodox Church as the first canonized Orthodox saint to have lived into the 21st century.

== Early life and education ==
Serghei Boghiu was born on 7 October 1912 in the village of Cuconeștii Vechi, Bălți County, in the historical region of Bessarabia (today in Moldova), the third of six children in a peasant family. He grew up in an Orthodox environment and from an early age was involved in church life and singing.

In 1926, at the age of fourteen, he entered the monastic community at Rughi Skete near Soroca, beginning his formation as a monk. Between 1928 and 1932 he studied at the school for church singers at Dobrușa Monastery, and from 1932 to 1940 at the monastic seminary of Cernica Monastery near Bucharest. Showing aptitude for drawing, he later enrolled at the Academy of Fine Arts in Bucharest (1940–1945) while also attending the Faculty of Orthodox Theology at the University of Bucharest (1942–1946), where he completed a thesis on the image of Christ in iconography.

He was tonsured a monk on 25 December 1937 at Dobrușa Monastery, receiving the name Sofian, ordained hierodeacon in 1939 at Bălți and hieromonk in 1945 for Antim Monastery in Bucharest. In June 1950 he was appointed abbot of Antim Monastery, a position he held for several years.

== Burning Bush movement ==
In 1940, after Bessarabia was annexed by the Soviet Union, Sofian moved permanently to Bucharest and settled at Antim Monastery. There he became involved in the spiritual circle known as Rugul Aprins (“Burning Bush”), which brought together monks, clergy and lay intellectuals to read patristic texts, study hesychast spirituality and practise the Jesus Prayer. The movement, initiated by the monk and writer Sandu Tudor, included figures such as Dumitru Stăniloae, Roman Braga, Arsenie Papacioc and other future confessors of the Romanian Church.

Sofian was influenced particularly by the Russian hieromonk Ioan Culighin, a spiritual heir of the Optina Monastery tradition, who lived for a period at Antim and introduced him to the discipline of the “prayer of the heart”. At the same time Sofian worked as a church painter and teacher of iconography. In addition to his responsibilities at Antim he served as abbot of Plumbuita Monastery in Bucharest between 1954 and 1958.

== Imprisonment ==
In June 1958 the communist authorities arrested a number of participants in the Burning Bush meetings, including Sofian, who were accused of “hostile mystical activities”. Tried together with other monks and intellectuals, he was sentenced to 15 years in prison and forced labour. He was initially held at Jilava Prison near Bucharest and in the penitentiary at Aiud, and later sent to the Salcia labour camp in the Danube Delta region.

Sofian spent approximately six years in detention and was released in 1964 under a general amnesty for political prisoners. Contemporary accounts describe harsh conditions—small cells, heavy labour and limited time outdoors—but they also note his calm attitude and refusal to inform on others. In later recollections of this period he described prison as a “school” in which he and other detainees deepened their practice of prayer and learned to forgive their persecutors.

== Return to Antim Monastery ==
After his release, Sofian spent a short period at Căldărușani Monastery before returning to Antim Monastery, where he resumed his pastoral and liturgical work from 1967 onwards. He again served as abbot and became the principal spiritual father and confessor of the community, hearing confessions of monks, clergy and lay visitors. Testimonies from those who knew him portray him as reserved in manner but approachable, with an emphasis on discretion, patience and moderation in his pastoral advice.

Sofian was known for his detailed knowledge of the Orthodox typikon and liturgical practice; visiting clergy often sought his guidance on the order of services, chanting and pastoral procedure. From Antim he also contributed to the formation of younger monks and students from theological institutes in Bucharest, many of whom later recalled him as an important influence on their spiritual and liturgical training.

== Iconography ==
Alongside his pastoral responsibilities Sofian pursued extensive work as a church painter. In Romania he took part in the painting or restoration of a number of churches and monasteries, including Antim Monastery and the church of the Schitul Maicilor in Bucharest, as well as churches in Moldavia and other regions. He headed the patriarchal iconography workshop in Bucharest, where he trained younger iconographers and supervised commissions for church decoration.

With the approval of Patriarch Justinian, Sofian travelled to the Middle East in 1971 at the invitation of the Lebanese monk Daniel (Bedran). He led a Romanian team that painted the interior of the Monastery of Saint George at Deir el-Harf in Lebanon, covering the church with frescoes in the neo-Byzantine style of the contemporary Romanian school. He later returned to Lebanon to paint the murals of Saint George Church in Broummana and undertook iconographic work in the Orthodox cathedral of Homs and other churches in Hama, Syria. Commentators have noted that his iconographic programmes in these churches link biblical themes with an emphasis on mercy and charity, for example by placing the scene of the Feeding of the Five Thousand above the entrance from which the Eucharistic chalice is carried.

== Pastoral teaching ==
Sofian’s sermons and conferences, many of which were recorded and later published, repeatedly stressed prayer, humility, forgiveness and almsgiving. Influenced by the hesychast tradition of the Burning Bush circle, he recommended the frequent repetition of the Jesus Prayer (“Lord Jesus Christ, have mercy on me”) as a way of maintaining the remembrance of God in daily life, whether at work, travelling or resting. He taught that such prayer should be supported by participation in the sacramental life of the Church, fasting and practical acts of charity.

Accounts from his spiritual children describe his approach in confession as generally mild and encouraging rather than punitive; he tended to avoid severe penances and instead urged penitents to adopt a life of repentance, reconciliation and thanksgiving. He warned against extremes in ascetic practice and advised Christians to follow a “middle way” that combined inner vigilance with moderation and responsibility in family and social life. In his recommendations for spiritual reading he frequently directed people to Scripture and to modern spiritual authors such as Silouan the Athonite.

These traits contributed to his reputation as “Apostle of Bucharest”, a title used for him in Romanian church and media sources, where he is portrayed as an important confessor and spiritual guide for the capital in the second half of the 20th century.

== Writings ==
Alongside his iconographic and pastoral work, Sofian published articles and interviews on theology, spirituality and art in Romanian church periodicals. A bibliography compiled after his death lists, among others, the study “Pictura murală și iconografia neobizantină în Biserica Ortodoxă Română” (“Mural painting and neo-Byzantine iconography in the Romanian Orthodox Church”, 1986), the article “Rugul Aprins și temnița” (“The Burning Bush and the prison”, 1996), the interview “Dialoguri despre rugăciune” (“Dialogues on prayer”, 1997) and the volume “Ne vorbește Părintele Sofian” (“Father Sofian speaks to us”, first published 1997). After his death, sermons and talks were edited and issued in collections such as “Buchet de cuvântări. Predici și meditații” (“Collected speeches: sermons and meditations”) and other homiletic volumes.

In the 2020s several works by and about him began to appear in other languages. In 2025 St. George Press in the United States published Daily Readings in the Tradition of the Philokalia, a collection of brief sayings from Sofian translated into English, and a companion volume of homilies was announced by the same press.

== Canonization ==
Sofian died on 14 September 2002 at Antim Monastery and was buried at Căldărușani Monastery in Gruiu, Ilfov County, where he had chosen his burial place in advance. On 11–12 July 2024 the Holy Synod of the Romanian Orthodox Church decided to canonize him along with fifteen other martyrs, confessors and ascetics of the 20th century, assigning his feast day to 16 September.

On 29 July 2024 his relics were exhumed at Căldărușani Monastery in preparation for the public veneration associated with his canonization. The exhumation service was conducted by Assistant Bishop Timotei of Prahova, after which the relics were placed in the cemetery church at Căldărușani and later transferred for veneration at Antim Monastery in Bucharest.

The general proclamation of the canonization of Sofian and the other new saints took place on 4 February 2025 at the Patriarchal Cathedral in Bucharest, during celebrations marking the centenary of the Romanian Patriarchate. The local proclamation at Antim Monastery was held on 16 September 2025. In a message for the occasion Patriarch Daniel of Romania characterised the new saint as “a confessor of the faith in an atheist regime, a hesychast spiritual father and a church painter”.

Veneration of Sofian has developed both in Romania and in the Republic of Moldova. His native village of Cuconeștii Vechi hosts a memorial house dedicated to him, containing manuscripts, icons and photographs, and annually commemorates his repose with religious and cultural events. In 2025 a church in the village of Manta, Cahul District, Moldova, was consecrated in his honour.

== Legacy ==
Within Romanian Orthodoxy Sofian is remembered as one of the principal monastic confessors formed by the Burning Bush movement and as a representative of the neo-Byzantine iconographic revival in the 20th century. His life—marked by early monastic commitment, artistic work, imprisonment under the communist regime and later pastoral service in Bucharest—has been the subject of biographies, documentary films and local conferences organised at Antim Monastery and elsewhere. The publication of his homilies and short sayings in Romanian and other languages has further contributed to his reception as a spiritual author within contemporary Orthodox literature.
