= Humbert of Maroilles =

Frankish monk, abbot, and saint

Abbot
- Born: in early 7th Mézières-sur-Oise
- Died: ~682
- Venerated in: Eastern Orthodox Church; Roman Catholic Church
- Feast: 25 March
- Attributes: A star on his forehead; a bear carrying Humbert's baggage; with an angel making a cross on Humbert's brow; with an angel showing Humbert the Cross
- Patronage: Ottawa, Canada

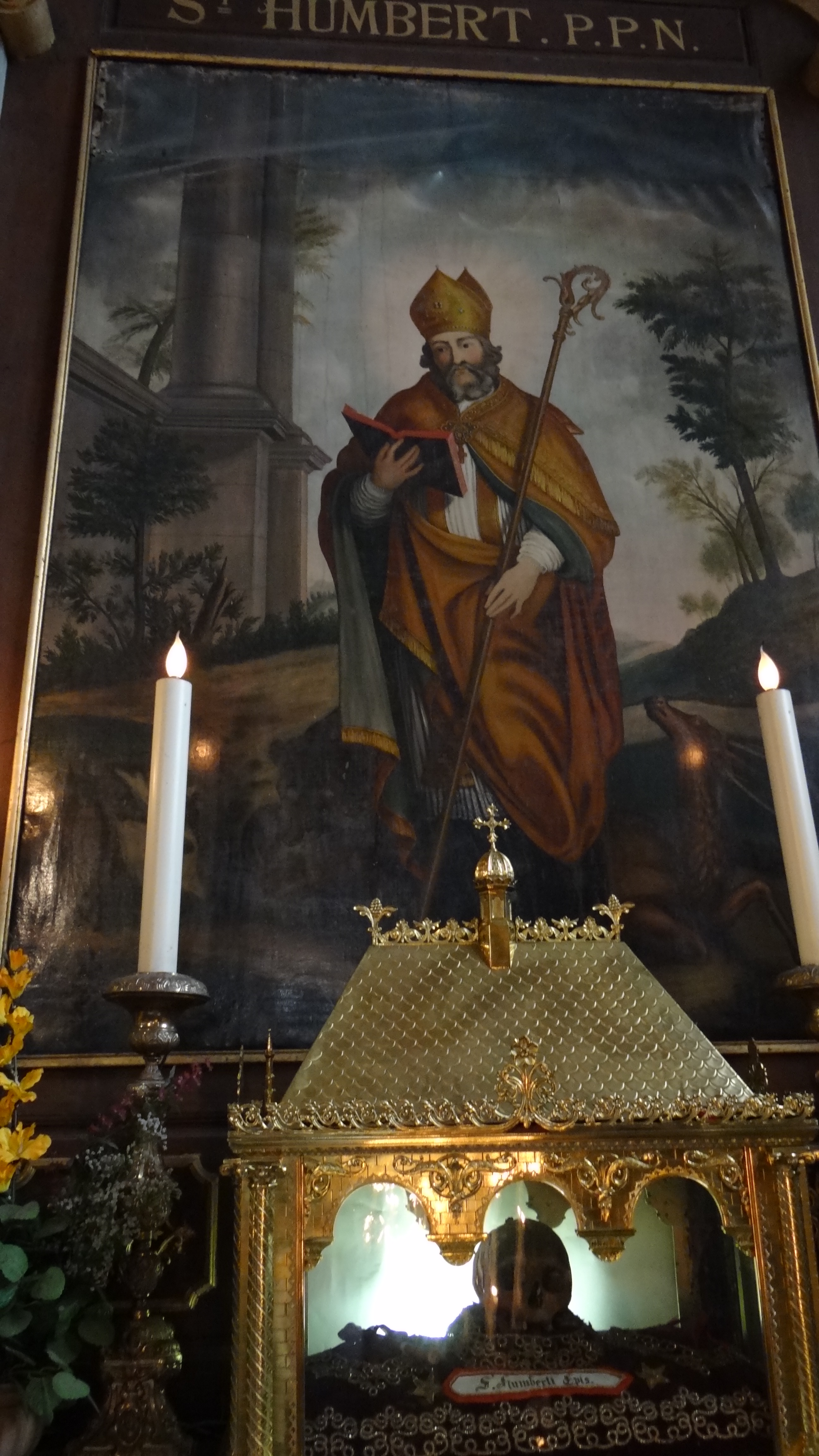
Humbert of Maroilles

Humbert of Maroilles (died ca. 680) was a Frankish monk, abbot, and saint. He founded Maroilles Abbey.

== Life ==
Humbert was born at Mézières-sur-Oise in the early 7th century. His parents, Evrard and Popita, were of the nobility. He trained as a Benedictine monk in Laon, and his family anticipated that he was destined for a successful career as a bishop. Upon the death of his parents, he returned to his estates in Mézières sur Oise to settle some inheritance issues. The fine food, comfortable accommodations, servants, hunting, and other distractions turned his mind away from monastic life. He spent many years there, until one day Bishop Amandus took him on a pilgrimage to Rome.

Humbert became a disciple and companion of the missionary bishop. Humbert was also a friend of the abbess Aldegundis.

Pope Martin I ordained him a missionary bishop; he worked mainly in the Low Countries.

In 652, he co-founded and became the first abbot of a monastery of Maroilles Abbey. On his second trip to Rome, he returned with relics and a statuette of the Virgin Mary, whom he named patroness of the abbey church under the title Maroilles Notre Dame des Affligés.

He died at Maroilles around the year 682. Saint Curcodomus succeeded him as abbot. Buildings of this monastery are still present there, although the abbey was ruined in the course of the French Revolution. The church of Vendegies au Bois was named after him.
