= Alektora =

Village in Limassol District, Cyprus

Alektora Αλέκτορα Gökağaç
- Village
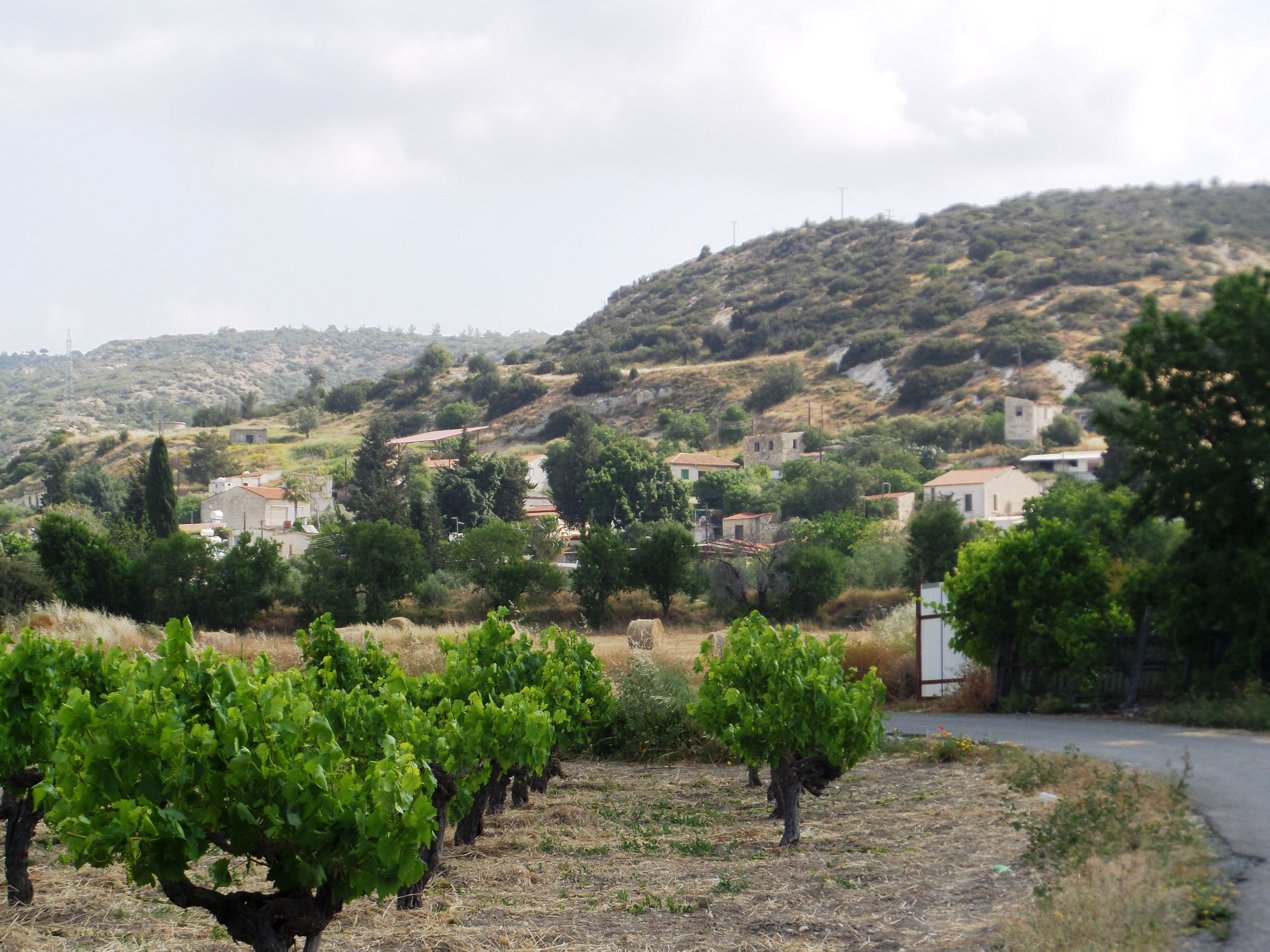

- Location in Cyprus
- Coordinates: 34°42′33″N 32°40′55″E
- Country: Cyprus
- District: Limassol District

Population (2011)
  - Total: 64
- Time zone: UTC+2 (EET)
  - Summer (DST): UTC+3 (EEST)

Alektora (Greek: Αλέκτορα), also known as Gökağaç (from Turkish), is a village in the Limassol District of Cyprus. It was established in the first millennium by residents of nearby villages and gradually Turkified and Islamicised during the rule of the Ottomans. It was inhabited almost exclusively by Turkish Cypriots before the Turkish invasion of Cyprus in 1974 and the population exchanges that occurred thereafter. The village now has a small community of Greek Cypriots.

== Etymology ==
Alektora comes from the Greek word alektor (αλέκτωρ), meaning rooster. In 1958, the Turkish Cypriot residents of the village adopted the alternative Turkish name Gökağaç, meaning "tree of heaven".

== Geography ==
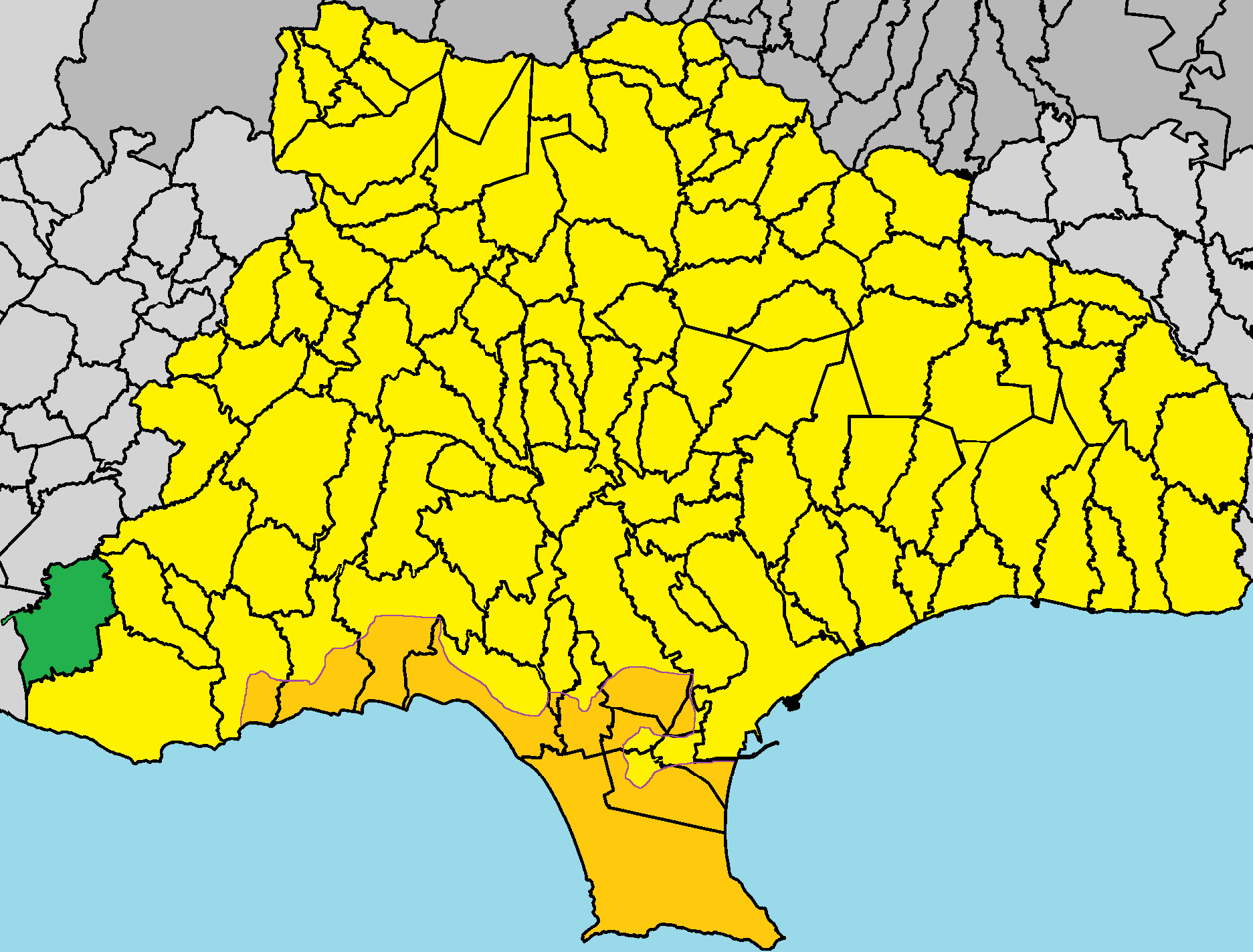
Alektora (green) in Limassol District (yellow)

Alektora is the westernmost settlement of Limassol District and shares a western border with Paphos District. It is also bordered by four other villages in Limassol District: Pano Archimandrita to the north, Pissouri to the south and southeast, Platanistia to the east, and Kouklia to the west.

== History ==
Alektora was founded in the first millennium by pine nut farmers from nearby villages. Pine nuts were a popular commodity in the Roman Empire due to their aphrodisiac properties. During the Frankish period, Alektora was a royal fief and grape vineyards gradually replaced pine nut trees as the main crop of the village. The indigenous population was also displaced by migrants from Palestine and Syria, who fled from the violence of the Crusades.

In 1571, Cyprus became part of the Ottoman Empire. Many Frankish and Latin inhabitants of Alektora converted to Islam to avoid persecution by the Ottomans. Consequently, the villagers of Alektora gradually adopted a Turkish Cypriot identity. There were reportedly a few Greek Cypriot villagers in the late 19th century, but all of them had left by the 1950s.

During intercommunal violence in 1963–1964, villagers from neighbouring Gerovasa and Malia sought refuge in Alektora. Some chose to stay in Alektora and did not return to their villages. After Turkey invaded Cyprus in 1974, the Turkish Cypriot residents of Alektora were moved to the British military base Akrotiri. They remained there until they were moved to Pentageia in a population exchange in January 1975. A small community of Greek Cypriot refugees and their descendants now reside in Alektora.

== Demographics ==
The population of Alektora reached its peak in 1973 with 490 residents, and was overwhelmingly Turkish Cypriot. As of 2011, Alektora had 64 residents, all of whom were Greek Cypriots.
