= Mamilian of Palermo =

Sicilian bishop and saint

Saint Mamilian of Palermo
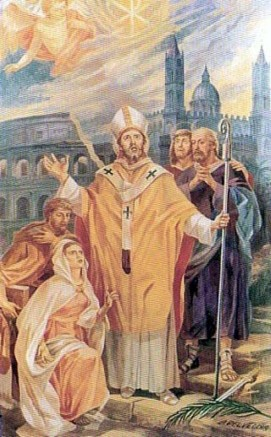
- Painting of St. Mamilian and his companions, located in the Cathedral of Palermo.

Bishop of Palermo
- Born: Palermo
- Died: 19 October 460; Giglio Island
- Venerated in: Eastern Orthodox Church; Roman Catholic Church
- Feast: 15 September; 16 June (diocese of Palermo)
- Attributes: episcopal attire
- Patronage: Diocese of Pitigliano-Sovana-Orbetello; Isola del Giglio

Saint Mamilian (Mamilianus) of Palermo, who is venerated with Nympha (Ninfa), Eustotius (Eustozio), Proculus (Proculo, Procuro), and Golbodeus (Golbodeo, Golbudeo), was a bishop of Palermo of the fifth century.

== Biography ==
Mamilian lived in Sicily at a time when the Vandals dominated the island. He served as bishop of Palermo but was exiled to Africa by the Vandals, who adhered to Arianism, around 450 AD with some Christian companions. One source states that Mamilian was exiled to Tuscany by Genseric, the Vandal king.

However, through the intercession of an African bishop or by some sympathetic Christians, he escaped to Sardinia. After that, he spent time on the island of Montecristo. According to a legend on Montecristo, Mamilian defeated a dragon on the island, and also changed the island's name from Montegiove ("Jove's Mountain") to Montecristo ("Christ's Mountain"). A community of hermits, said to have been Mamilian's followers, lived on the island, and around 600 AD, a monastery was built.

He subsequently went also to the island of Giglio, where he died.

Golbodeus's name may be a corruption of Quodvultdeus, a name shared by another 5th-century saint.

== Veneration ==
According to a tradition on Giglio, inhabitants of Elba and Genoa attempted to steal Mamilian's relics on the very day of his burial and the saint's body was torn to pieces. The island of Giglio kept the saint's arm.

Some sources say Mamilian's relics were translated to Rome, to the Church of Santa Maria in Monticelli, and subsequently to Spoleto. Some of his relics may have been taken to Palermo. Another tradition states that Cosimo III de' Medici, Grand Duke of Tuscany returned Mamilian's entire body to Giglio in the 17th century.

On the island of Giglio, celebrations dedicated to Saint Mamilian start on September 15 and last for four days, consisting of a process of his relics (Mamilian's arm), games, music, and a traditional mass.

In 1673, Archbishop Juan Lozano of Palermo erected statues to Mamilian, Eustotius, Proculus, and Golbodeus in the cathedral of Palermo. The statues were made by Travaglia (Mamilian, Golbodeus) and Antonio Anello (Eustotius, Proculus).

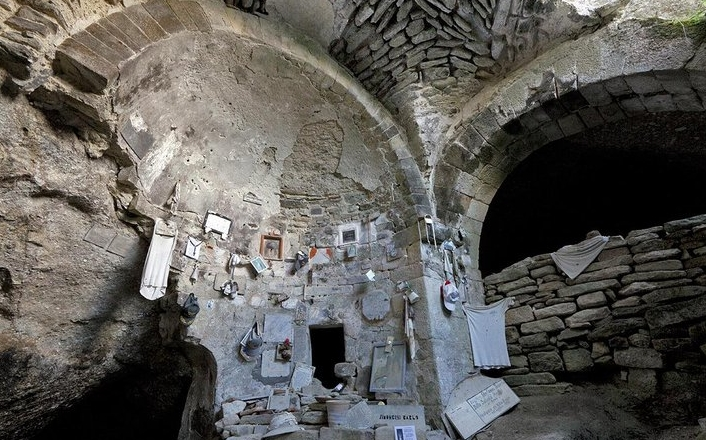
Grotto of Saint Mamilian. Island of Montecristo.

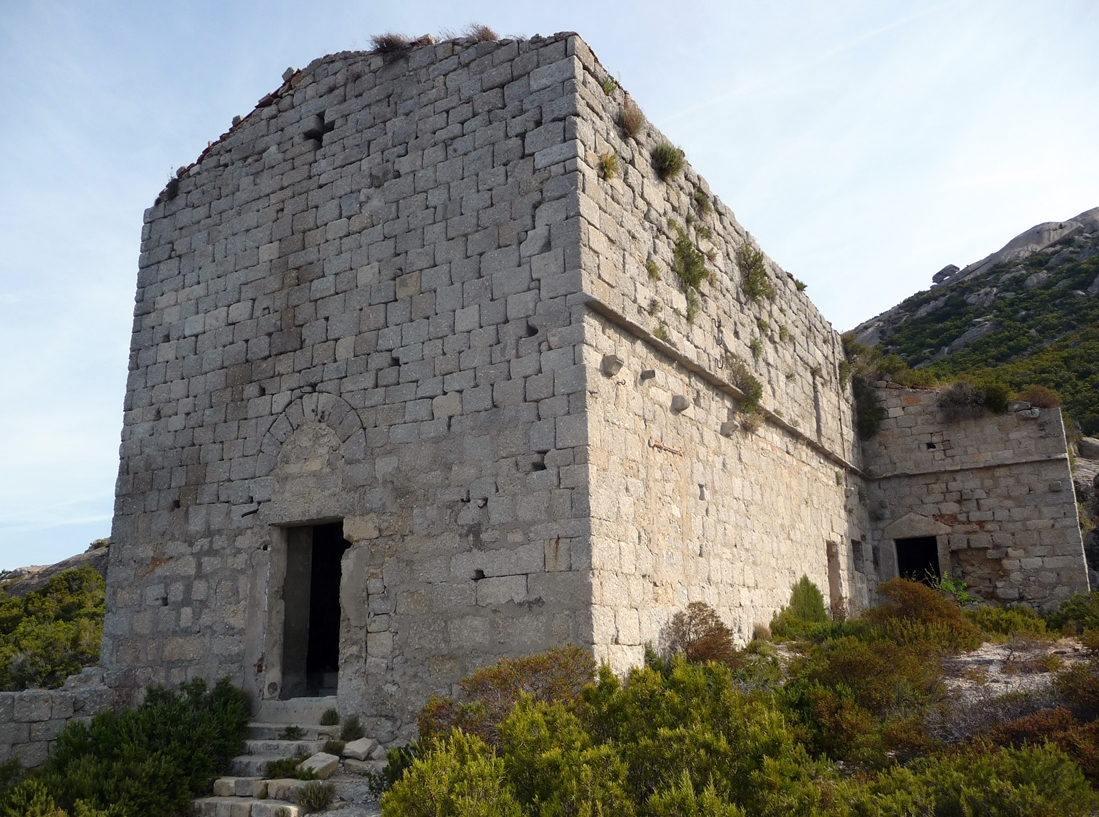
Monastery of San Mamiliano, Island of Montecristo.

== Bibliography ==
- Michele Marinelli, San Mamiliano Monaco Vescovo di Palermo, Grosseto 2000
- Ugo Russo, San Mamiliano Vescovo e Martire del V secolo, evangelizzatore della Toscana, supporto CD, Palermo, 2002
- Gloria Peria e Silvestre Ferruzzi, L'isola d'Elba e il culto di San Mamiliano, Portoferraio 2010
