= Index of Akrotiri and Dhekelia–related articles =

This page lists topics related to Akrotiri and Dhekelia, two British Overseas Territories on the island of Cyprus.

== A ==
- Akrotiri and Dhekelia
- Akrotiri (village) — within the Akrotiri sovereign base area.
- Akrotiri Cantonment
- Ayios Nikolaos Station
- Akrotiri Peninsula (Cyprus) — peninsula within which the Akrotiri SBA lies
- Avdimou — village lying partly within the Akrotiri SBA

== B ==
- British Forces Broadcasting Service
- British Forces Cyprus
- British Overseas Territories

== C ==
- Cyprus

== D ==
- Dhekelia Cantonment
- Dreamer's Bay
- Dhekelia Airfield — British military airfield in the Eastern SBA
- Dhekelia Power Station — power station on land surrounded by the Dhekelia SBA

== E ==
- Episkopi Bay
- Episkopi Cantonment
- Episkopi, Limassol — village lying partly within the Akrotiri SBA
- Erimi — village lying partly within the Akrotiri SBA

== F ==
- Flag of Akrotiri and Dhekelia

== K ==
- King Richard School, Cyprus — secondary school serving the Eastern Sovereign Base Area
- Kolossi — village lying partly within the Akrotiri SBA
- Kolossi Castle — medieval castle near Kolossi village
- Kourion — ancient city whose archaeological area lies within the Akrotiri SBA

== L ==
- LGBT rights in Akrotiri and Dhekelia
- Limassol Salt Lake
- London and Zürich Agreements — 1960 agreements that established the Sovereign Base Areas

== M ==
- Modern history of Cyprus

== N ==
- No. 84 Squadron RAF — RAF search and rescue squadron based at RAF Akrotiri
- No. 903 Expeditionary Air Wing — RAF expeditionary air wing based at RAF Akrotiri

== O ==
- Ormidhia
- Outline of Akrotiri and Dhekelia

== P ==
- Paramali — village lying partly within the Akrotiri SBA
- Pergamos, Cyprus — village almost entirely surrounded by the Dhekelia SBA
- Pyla — village adjacent to the Dhekelia SBA

== R ==
- RAF Akrotiri

== S ==
- Sovereign Base Areas Customs and Immigration
- Sovereign Base Areas Police
- St. John's School, Cyprus — school at Episkopi Cantonment serving the Western SBA

== T ==
- Trachoni, Limassol — village lying partly within the Akrotiri SBA
- Troodos Station — retained British signals station operated by British Forces Cyprus personnel

== U ==
- United Kingdom

== X ==
- Xylotymvou

== Y ==
- Ypsonas — municipal district, southern part within the Akrotiri SBA

== See also ==
- Lists of country-related topics - similar lists for other countries
