= Akrotiri Cantonment =

Military base in Akrotiri and Dhekelia

- Φρουρά Ακρωτηρίου (Greek); Ağrotur Kantonu (Turkish)
- Akrotiri and Dhekelia, Cyprus
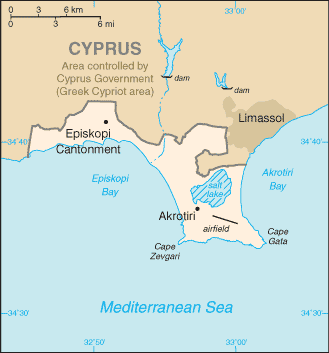

Site information
- Type: Military base
- Controlled by: (United Kingdom) British Forces Cyprus

Location
- Coordinates: 34°38′09″N 32°56′06″E

Garrison information
- Occupants: 1st Battalion, Light Infantry

Akrotiri Cantonment (Greek: Φρουρά Ακρωτηρίου, Turkish: Ağrotur Kantonu), also simply named Akrotiri, is a military base in Akrotiri and Dhekelia, a British Overseas Territory on the island of Cyprus, administered as the Sovereign Base Areas. It is the smaller of the two British military bases on the island, and it is also the location of Episkopi Cantonment, which is home to the 1st Battalion, The Princess of Wales's Royal Regiment. The same is also with RAF Akrotiri, a Royal Air Force station on the island. However, the 1st Battalion under Army 2020 has already moved from Episkopi Cantonment (the capital of the British Overseas Territory called Akrotiri and Dhekelia) to Paderborn, Germany some time ago; and after all, it will move from there to be stationed at Bulford Camp.

It forms a part of British Forces Cyprus.

Akrotiri contains the village of Akrotiri (the same is also with Episkopi Cantonment, the capital of both Akrotiri and Dhekelia Sovereign Base Areas) and a portion of the villages: Episkopi, Trachoni, Kolossi and Asomatos. However, the cantonment, just like Dhekelia, doesn't expand through Northern Cyprus and the Green Line crossing point from the Greek Republic of Cyprus, but it comes closer to the borders of the Cypriot city of Limassol.

The cantonment is also referred to as the Western Sovereign Base Area prior to its location in Akrotiri.

== See also ==
- Ayios Nikolaos (SBA)
- Ayios Nikolaos Station
- British Forces Cyprus
- Royal Military Police
- Sovereign Base Areas
- Sovereign Base Areas Customs
- Sovereign Base Areas Police
- St. John's School
