= Ayios Nikolaos, Cyprus =

Ayios Nikolaos Άγιος Νικόλαος
- Village
- Location in Cyprus
- Coordinates: 35°5′17″N 33°53′23″E
- Country: Cyprus; Akrotiri and Dhekelia
- Time zone: UTC+2 (EET)
  - Summer (DST): UTC+3 (EEST)
- Postcode: 5620 (Cyprus postcode)

Ayios Nikolaos (Greek: Άγιος Νικόλαος) is a village and present British garrison located in the British Sovereign Base Areas of Akrotiri and Dhekelia in the Dhekelia Cantonment on Cyprus. It is the site of a Green Line crossing point controlled on the one side by Sovereign Base Areas Police and by the police of the de facto state of Northern Cyprus on the other side.

The main road from Larnaca to Famagusta runs through the village.
