= Operation Anarchist =

US-UK weapons monitoring in the Middle East

Operation Anarchist was a joint operation between the American National Security Agency and British Government Communications Headquarters to monitor advanced weapons systems in the Middle East, with a particular focus on Israel. Begun in 1998, it was publicly exposed in January 2016 as a result of documents released by Edward Snowden. It has been called the worst intelligence breach in Israel's history.

== The Operation ==
The operation was run out of GCHQ headquarters in Cheltenham, with most of the surveillance taken from RAF Troodos, GCHQ used highly advanced and sophisticated communications and intelligence from the SIGNT installation in the Troodos Mountains of Cyprus, with RAF Menwith Hill, a joint US-British satellite surveillance base in Britain, also participating. The Israeli Air Force's UAV, Air Force, navy, missile defence and satellite communications was its primary target. Encrypted video transmissions between drones and their bases were intercepted from Troodos and analyzed using powerful advanced computing systems, as well as the open-source software tools ImageMagick and AntiSky, which allow users to patiently sort through the pixels in order to decrypt them. This was the preferred method over using the massive computing power it would have taken to unscramble the encrypted signals in near real time. Some images were clearer than others, as the success of the decryption varied. The intercepted images were largely low-resolution analog feeds used to check the condition of the drones, allowing the NSA and GCHQ to see the payloads the drones were carrying, but not the actual surveillance data. Surveillance feeds were, however, sometimes captured from small Israeli drones. GCHQ and NSA also successfully breached the security of Israeli military and communication satellites which were encrypted.

Capturing these videos became very difficult as Israel shifted to using digital video feeds mixed with other data, with a 2010 GCHQ report noting that it lacked the systems to properly monitor the new Israeli technological capabilities. In addition to footage from drone cameras, the operation also tracked the movements of Israeli drones, using the transmissions drones sent off to update their bases on their location. Satellite surveillance systems at Menwith Hill were used to intercept transmissions between Israeli drones and satellites, capturing 20 separate videos in all. Training missions, as well as operations over the Golan Heights were monitored, with Israeli preparations for a possible strike on Iran watched extremely closely. One leaked report noted that Israeli drones were also being monitored due to Israeli UAV exports to many other countries, and Yedioth Ahronoth noted that this, along with the great interest shown in precisely what radar was mounted on the drones, indicated a commercial interest in the drones in addition to a security interest.

While drones were the primary target, on January 3, 2008, computer technicians from Menwith Hill managed to capture 14 seconds of cockpit footage from an Israeli F-16 fighter jet on a bombing mission over Gaza, showing a target on the ground being closely tracked. A sub-operation of Operation Anarchist, code-named Operation Runway, tracked the Israeli Black Sparrow air-launched missiles, which were used as targeting missiles during tests of the Arrow missile.

In addition to Israel, advanced weapons systems used by Egypt, Turkey, Iran, Syria, and Hezbollah were also hacked into. In particular, the operation managed to obtain footage of Iranian-made drones operated by Hezbollah and Syrian Armed Forces.

== Exposure ==
On January 28, 2016, The Intercept, Der Spiegel, and Yedioth Ahronoth jointly broke the story, based on documents provided by NSA leaker Edward Snowden.

Israeli minister of energy Steinitz said that he was disappointed, but not surprised by the reports. An Israeli security official referred to Operation Anarchist as "an earthquake... the worst leak in the history of Israeli intelligence."
