= Kingsfield Airfield =

Airfield in Dhekelia Cantonment

King's Field Kingsfield
- Part of Dhekelia Cantonment
- Akrotiri and Dhekelia in Cyprus
- Transport Command Blackburn Beverley testing the new airstrip at the airfield, taken 14 April 1964.

Site information
- Owner: Ministry of Defence

Location
- Coordinates: 35°00′53″N 33°43′01″E

Site history
- Built: March 24, 1964; 62 years ago
- Built by: Cyprus Park Squadron; Royal Engineers
- Materials: Havara
- Events: Black September; Turkish invasion of Cyprus

Airfield information
- Identifiers: ICAO: LCRE
- Elevation: 88 metres (289 ft) AMSL
Runways
| Direction | Length and surface |
|---|---|
| 06/24 | 1,240 metres (4,068 ft) Asphalt |

King's Field, also known as Kingsfield and Noddy Land (ICAO: LCRE) is a small airfield located in Dhekelia Cantonment, Cyprus. No. 16 Flight AAC, which operated Westland Gazelle AH.1 helicopters, was based here.

Construction of an airstrip at Dhekelia began on 24 March 1964, jointly undertaken by the Cyprus Park Squadron, Royal Engineers, and the Royal Army Service Corps. In just three weeks, it was completed and opened on 14 April with a 1,200-meter airstrip. The airstrip was opened by Air Chief Marshal Sir Denis Barnett and dedicated to Major Mike King. Throughout the 1960s, it was primarily used to support parachute training of the Royal Air Force and Army Air Corps. However, that single-use role changed during the Black September conflicts in 1970. King's Field saw use as a staging point for evacuating casualties from Jordan, and it served a similar purpose during the Turkish invasion of Cyprus in 1974. It has also housed the Crusaders Flying Club and held combined services sport-parachuting championships.

== History ==
=== Construction ===
In the 1952 Proceedings of the United States Naval Institute, the establishment of a new cantonment at Dhekelia was discussed, stating that it would include a sheltered military support port and an airstrip. However, the airstrip was not constructed immediately until it was urgently needed by the 1960s. The Royal Engineers were assigned to construct the airstrip, and they estimated that it would only take three weeks.

Construction began on 24 March 1964 on the western side of the cantonment, over agricultural land and scrubland where sheep grazed. At 12 noon, a 12-ton D8H bulldozer arrived to work on flattening and clearing across two cornfields and scrubland. Over the span of three weeks, 60 personnel from the Cyprus Park Squadron worked 12 hour-shifts over the entire week. A quarry was opened to provide havara for the runway, and a total of 65,901 tons of the material were transported mainly by drivers from 1, 7, and 65 Companies, Royal Army Service Corps. This required 9,347 loads on lorries, which collectively travelled a total of 32,714 miles and consuming 14,771 gallons of fuel. The largest recorded movement in one day was 4,022 tons, while the hourly record settled at 5,271.5 tons. The operation was made possible by Warrant Officer Collins, who served as the Squadron's plant foreman and acting commander of the Plant Troop.

Construction of King's Field undertaken by the Cyprus Park Squadron in Cyprus, 1964.

True to the three-week premise, on 14 April, the last roller left the site just 80 minutes before the given deadline. At noon, a RAF Transport Command Blackburn Beverley landed on the havara strip, kicking up a cloud of dust. After the aircraft left and the dust had settled, the final layer of oil was applied. That day, a party was held and the airstrip was officially opened by Air Chief Marshal Sir Denis Barnett, who then individually congratulated every man involved in construction. He also presented a £20 Cheque to the Sappers that helped funded the party. Named King's Field, the airstrip was dedicated to Major Mike King, squadron commander of the Cyprus Park Squadron. He later stated, "Everyone worked extremely hard to make the project a success and I feel proud to have had these men working under me. A special tribute is due to the Royal Army Service Corps drivers. They were a magnificent bunch and obviously enjoyed the challenge the project presented."

=== Operations ===
Kingsfield was equipped with a 1,200 metre long hard compressed gravelled runway. Upon opening, it was intended to allow Beverley aircraft to land and resupply the garrison in the event that other airfields outside of the Sovereign Base Area was unavailable. It had no accommodation, and parachutes for training were stored at the RAF Nicosia Safety Equipment Section. Following opening, the 16 Flight, Army Air Corps was based at Kingsfield, commanded by Captain Pete Courtnay. As Royal Air Force personnel were prevented from participating in their freefall programme at previous locations, they approached the Army at Kingsfield. The personnel were welcomed and given access to both aircraft and a parachute drop zone in the Dhekelia area. The opening training programme of the Combined Services Parachute Club took place on Kingfield's airstrip. Training would take place on Saturday mornings for about three hours, and personnel at Nicosia would have to drive about 60 miles to Dhekelia. It earned the nickname 'Noddy Land', as personnel stationed there would only have morning shifts due to the hot afternoons.

=== 1970s ===
By the 1970s, Kingsfield Airfield had shifted from parachute training operations to serving as a staging ground for evacuations. This notably began during Black September in 1970, when the 30 Regiment RCF assisted with handling returning aircraft carrying casualties from Jordan at Kingsfield to BHM Dhekelia. A total of 101 sorties, 1,200 passengers, and 830,000 lbs of freight were handled during this operation. In 1970, the No. 70 Squadron RAF arrived at RAF Akrotiri, principal and remaining RAF station in Cyprus. As a result, Lockheed C-130 Hercules aircraft regularly flew to Kingsfield Airfield.

The 38 Group's Tactical Communications Wing arrived and encamped at Kingsfield in July 1974 during an exercise. The Turkish invasion of Cyprus broke out on the 20th that month, and Kingsfield began serving as a staging base for evacuations. The unit was ordered to leave Cyprus, but was recalled when an evacuation operation developed at Kingsfield. They had already departed by then, and returned and re-established their equipment. Royal Air Force aircraft were operating from the airfield, which forwarded evacuees onward to RAF Akrotiri. Other national groups were evacuated by different means, including US Navy helicopters and French ships. By the evening of 24 July 1974, the onward movement of evacuees opting to go to Britain were completed. Over a week, about 4,500 civilians were evacuated from the airstrip, and across both Sovereign Base Areas, more than 7,500 people of 46 nationalities were evacuated by air. Following the evacuations, abandoned cars and empty marquees were left at Kingsfield, and the barracks was damaged.

After 55 years of continuous overseas operations, the squadron and its aircraft departed from RAF Akrotiri in 1975. In 1978, Kingsfield Airfield held a combined services sport-parachuting championship sponsored by British tobacco manufacturer Rothmans International. Sixteen Arab citizens participating in the event were subjected to a strict check, and were received by personnel from Dhekelia Cantonment. In the late 1980s, Kingsfield Airfield made headlines as the RAF conducted trials of 'desert pink' paint on aircraft at the base which made aircraft ‘invisible’ during flight. These trials became successful and was used on numerous RAF aircraft during the Gulf War of 1991.

=== Crusasers Gliding Club ===
In the 1960s, the Crusaders Gliding Club was established at the airfield. The club was housed within two former RAF hangars for aircraft storage and maintenance on the southwestern side of the airfield. It maintained a fleet of one Scheibe Falke, one Slingsby T.21, two ASK 13s, one Schleicher K 8, and one Schleicher ASK 18. It operated there until 29 February 2012, when it was shut down due to the Airspace Rules set by the Cypriot Air Authorities.

== Present ==
On 11 May 2000, a large emergency services exercise was held involving 3,000 personnel, including those from Sovereign Base Area and Cypriot police, Larnaca and Nicosia hospitals, and Cypriot fire services. During the exercise, a mock aeroplane was made using three disused buses crafted by the 62 Cyprus Engineer Squadron. They were painted white under a "Majestic Airways" slogan, simulating a civilian plane crash. Personnel from the Episkopi Cantonment participated by acting as casualties.

As of 2024, Kingsfield Airfield is opened to recreational flight by the Cyprus Skydive Association during weekends, while continuing military operations on weekdays.

== Accidents & incidents ==
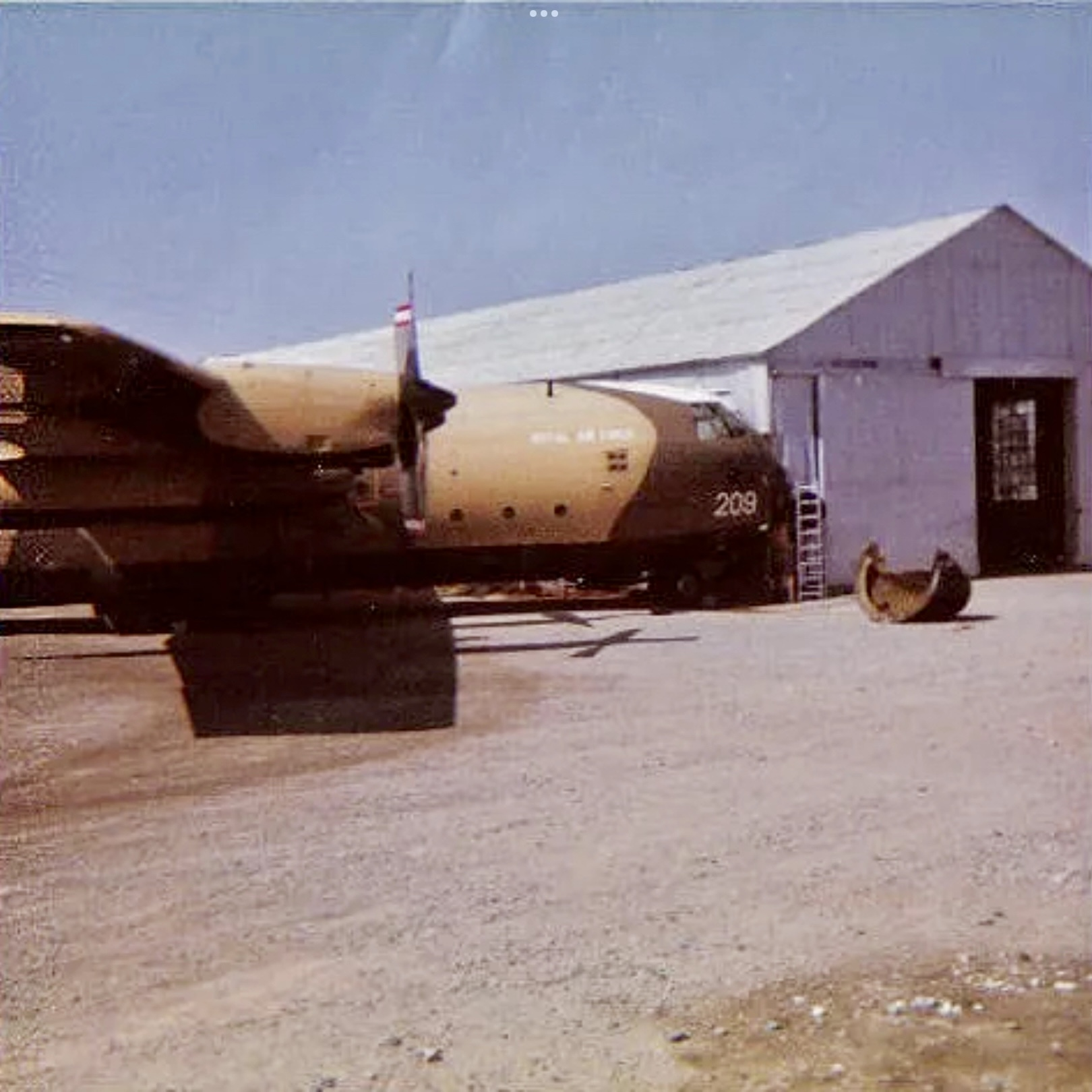
Hercules XV209 against a hangar.

- In September 1972, a C-130 aircraft was left with one engine running during mid-unloading. At the time, the crew left the loadmaster in the cockpit to join an ice-cream queue. Due to a mistake, the brake pressure dropped causing the aircraft to taxi itself towards a nearby hangar. This resulted in considerable damage to the nose, in which the aircraft was tested with a touch-and-go maneuver to decide if it would be scrapped or not. Later on, C1 XV209 was prepared to be able to fly to RAF Akrotiri for full repairs.

== Bibliography ==
- Sutton, D. J. (1984). The Story of the Royal Army Service Corps and Royal Corps of Transport, 1945–1982. L. Cooper. p. 710. ISBN 0436506068.
