= King Richard School, Cyprus =

King Richard School Cyprus
- Dhekelia, BFPO 58; Cyprus

Information
- Type: MOD school
- Established: 1958 initially as a co-educational boarding school
- Department for Education URN: 132420 Tables
- Ofsted: Reports
- Principal: Mr Richard Sproson
- Gender: Coeducational
- Age: 11 to 18
- Enrolment: up to 150
- Houses: Apollo & Poseidon
- Colours: Yellow, Blue. White, Grey, Green
- Website: http://www.kingrichardschoolcyprus.com

King Richard School is a secondary school located operated by MOD Schools in Cyprus. It serves military families based at the British Eastern Sovereign Base Area (ESBA) in Dhekelia and the nearby Ayios Nikolaos Station. It is a sister school of St. John's School in the Western Sovereign Base Area (WSBA) in Episkopi.

== History ==
King Richard School was founded in 1958 at the already existing Dhekelia Garrison to serve the children of military personnel stationed on the island. Opened by Major General D. A. Kendrew in February 1958, welcoming 168 boarders and 88 day students.

The school was still under construction: C Block didn’t yet exist, and the Annexe – previously the Nursing Sisters’ Mess – was awaiting conversion into classrooms.

The closure in 1961 of Karaolos School, near Famagusta, brought new students to KRS, and a consequent shortage of teaching rooms. Lefkaritis buses became classrooms, with the teacher on the driver’s seat, while the passenger seats accommodated students.

This was the period of noise and dust. C Block was constructed amid the din of pneumatic drills, mechanical shovels, and compressors, and in neighbouring B Block many staff ended up losing their voices! By 1962 most of the building work was complete, including St. George’s Church – latterly St. Barnabas’.

Since 1958 KRS has seen thirteen headteachers, hundreds of teaching and support staff, and thousands of students. In 2009 KRS was federated with St John’s School, Episkopi.

== Curriculum ==
Like all MOD schools, King Richard School follows the National Curriculum and is inspected by Ofsted. It often co-organises activities and outings with St. John's School such as Sports Day, Ski Trip and Swimming Gala.

They have also done a trip with St. John’s School to Borneo as part of a British Forces funding program for children of the armed forces.

== See also ==
- British Forces Cyprus
