= Paramali =

Paramali Παραμάλι (Greek) Çayönü (Turkish)
- village
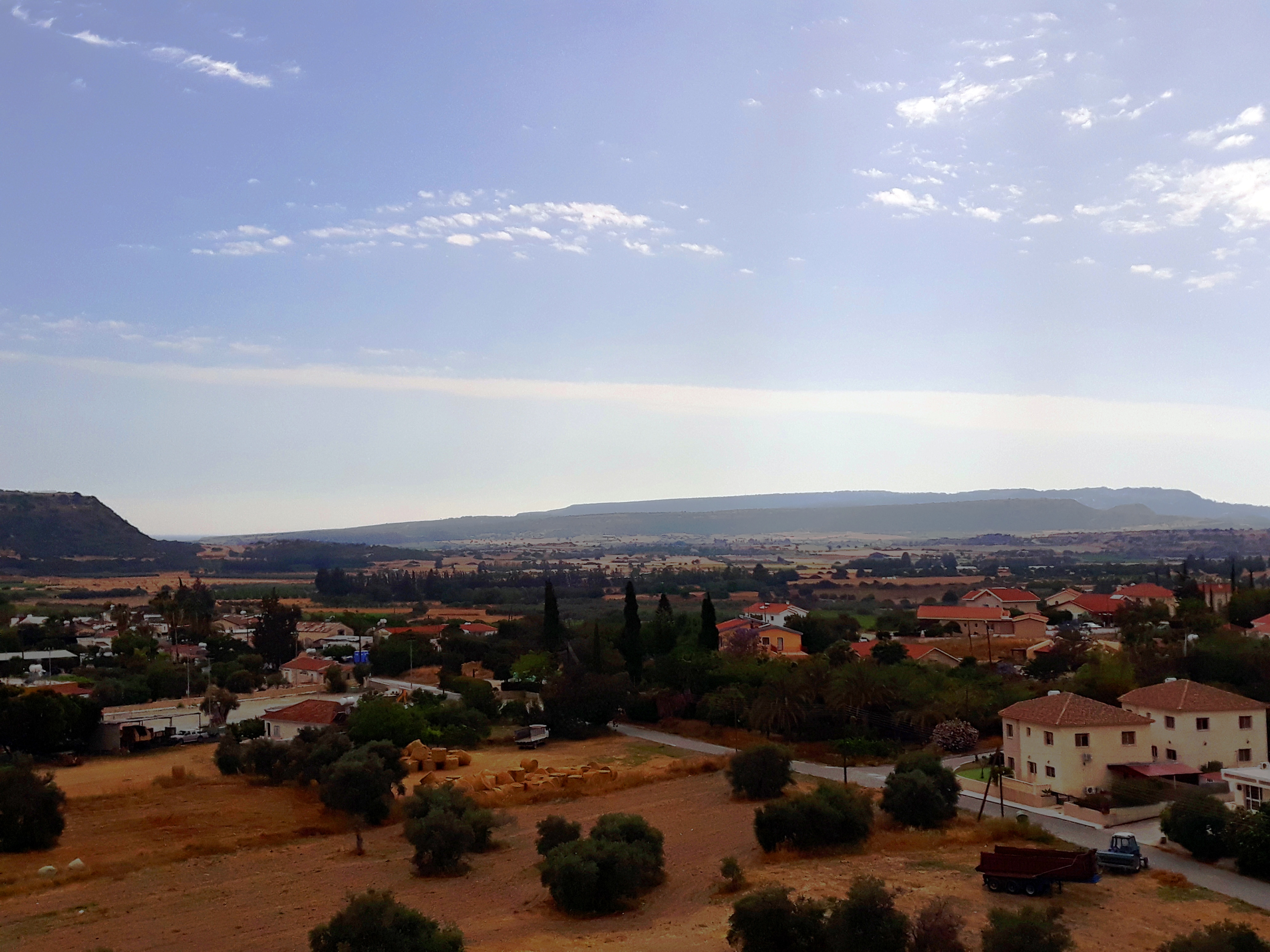

- Location in Cyprus
- Coordinates: 34°40′35″N 32°47′32″E
- Country: Cyprus
- District: Limassol District

Population (2001)
  - Total: 148
- Time zone: UTC+2 (EET)
  - Summer (DST): UTC+3 (EEST)

Paramali (Greek: Παραμάλι, Turkish: Paramal or Çayönü) is a village on the south coast of the island of Cyprus, in the Limassol District 4 kilometres (2.5 mi) east of Avdimou. Its district covers an area stretching north from the south coast of Cyprus, with roughly equal parts falling in the British Overseas Territory of Akrotiri and Dhekelia to the south, and in the Republic of Cyprus to the north.

The original village settlement (towards the north of the district) was majority Turkish-Cypriot, with the Greek-Cypriot minority leaving in the disturbances of the early 1960s. Turkish-Cypriots from other villages then came in 1974, after which the whole population left for the temporary camps at "Happy Valley" inside the British territory, from where they were evacuated out of RAF Akrotiri, and ended up mostly in the abandoned Greek-Cypriot village of Kalopsida, in the Turkish-controlled area. The original village was not settled by Greek-Cypriots from the north, but was abandoned (the collapsed roofs can be seen on satellite maps on the web). Now it is mainly used by the British military for exercises, particularly to ready them for Afghanistan, and famously for a much-photographed exercise in 2006 in which Prince William took part.

There is now a Greek-Cypriot village settlement in what was formerly called "Paramali Station" in roughly the centre of the district, intersected by both the main east-west road and the Republic-SBA boundary. It is mainly populated by Greek-Cypriots who left the north in 1974. There is an abandoned mosque, and a new Greek Orthodox church. The Greek-Cypriot population grew inside the British territory to the extent that in 1989 the British administration had to make legal arrangements for election of a village council, as there was still nobody living in the northerly, republican part of the village district. It is the only village with such arrangements in the SBAs except for Akrotiri, which was wholly inside the SBAs from the creation of the Republic and SBAs in 1960. Subsequently housing has been developed on the republican side of the boundary, close to the main road and the motorway.

The British military have 2 fenced residential compounds in the east of the district, serving the Episkopi Cantonment and called "North Paramali" and "South Paramali" (on the respective sides of the main east-west road). Flagstaff House, the official residence of the Administrator of the British Overseas Territory, who is always also Commander British Forces Cyprus, is in South Paramali.

There are turtle-nesting areas on the main beach on the coast, protected by the fact that the roads down to them are not obviously marked. But the beaches are also used by kite-surfers and others.
