= Troodos Station =

Royal Air Force signals station in the Troodos Mountains

- Part of Strategic Command
- Troodos Mountains in Cyprus
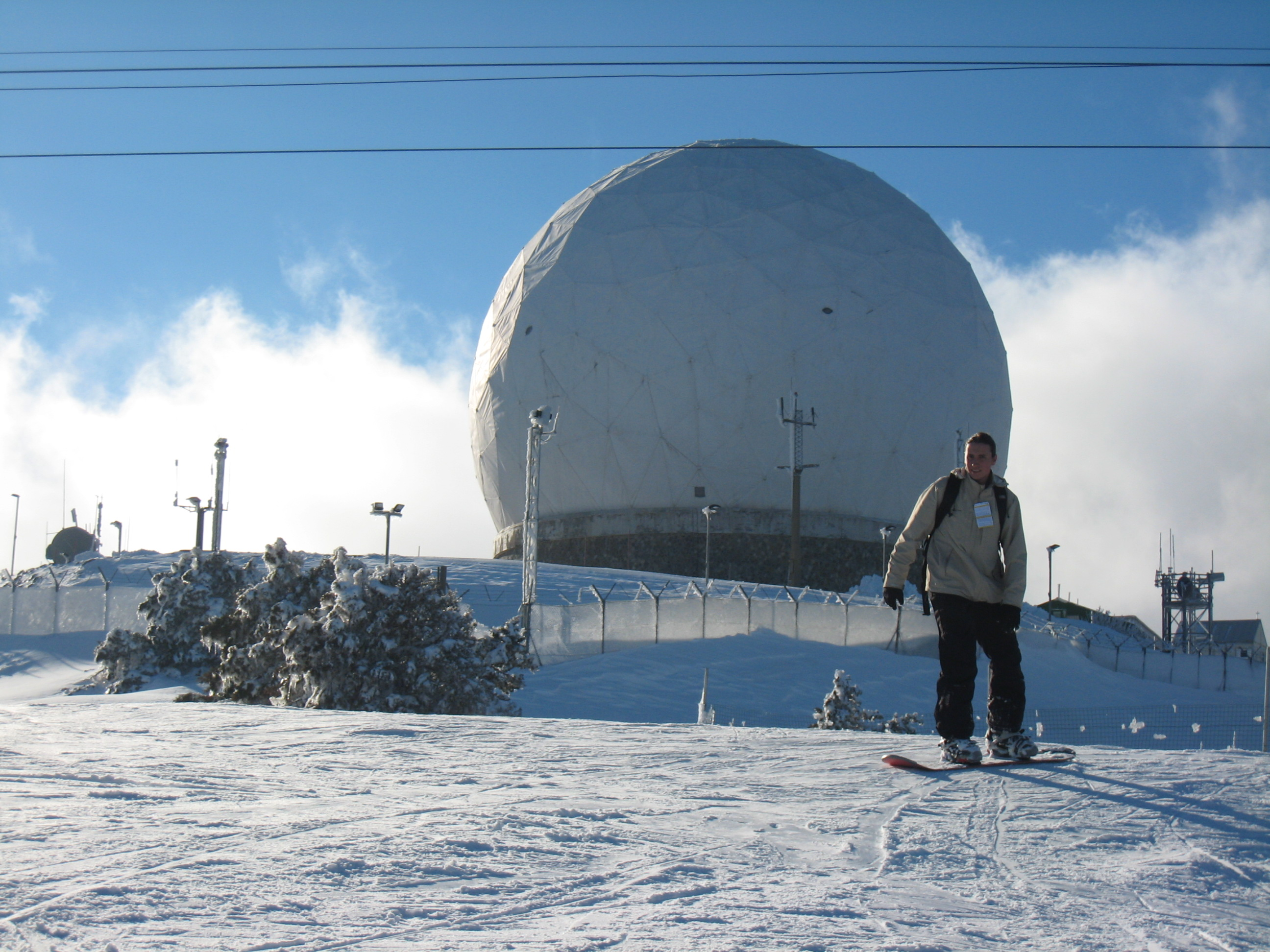

Site information
- Type: Signals intelligence gathering and radar station
- Owner: Ministry of Defence
- Operator: Strategic Command
- Controlled by: British Forces Cyprus

Location
- Shown within Cyprus
- Coordinates: 34.93725°N 32.86286°E
- Area: 50 hectares

Site history
- Built: 1878
- In use: 1878–present

Garrison information
- Occupants: Golf Section, Joint Service Signal Unit (Cyprus)

Troodos Station, formerly Royal Air Force Troodos, is a retained British Strategic Command site in the Republic of Cyprus.

Troodos Station is a remote Signals Station operated by personnel from Golf Section, Joint Service Signal Unit (Cyprus). The station parents the Mount Olympus radar site, operated by a small contingent of RAF personnel.

The station is based deep within the Troodos Mountains, approximately 23 kilometres (14 mi) north of Episkopi.

== History ==
Troodos Station is the oldest remaining British military base in Cyprus, dating from 1878. Initially it was used as a cool summer field hospital for troops from the Egyptian Campaign. British Army and Government officials also used it as a summer retreat. The governor had its summer residence closeby.

== Current use ==
Declassified documents show that RAF Troodos intercepted satellite communications for the Government Communications Headquarters (GCHQ), and documents released by Edward Snowden suggest this has continued in recent years funded by the U.S. National Security Agency. Information from Snowden also indicates the site acts as a listening post for radio signals from the near Middle East.

The British National Space Centre Starbrook wide-field telescope has been here since 2006. It can detect orbiting objects from 1.5 metres (4 ft 11 in) in size.

== See also ==
- Ayios Nikolaos Station
- List of Royal Air Force stations
