= St. John's School, Cyprus =

St. John's School
- Episkopi, Limassol District, BFPO 53, BF1 2AS; Cyprus

Information
- Type: Service Children's Education school
- Motto: "Excellence, Learning and Leadership"
- Established: 1960 (66 years ago); new school 1974 (52 years ago)
- Local authority: Defence Children's Services, Upavon, Wiltshire
- Department for Education URN: 132416 Tables
- Ofsted: Reports
- Acting Headteacher: Mr Colin Guyton
- Gender: Co-educational
- Age: 11 to 18
- Houses: Apollo and Poseidon
- Colours: yellow and blue
- Website: stjohnsschoolcyprus.com

St. John's School is a secondary school located within the British military complex Episkopi Cantonment in Cyprus and is run by the Service Children's Education (SCE). It is one of two schools serving the military families and employees of the Western Sovereign Base Area (WSBA). Younger children attend Episkopi Primary School.

It is a sister school of King Richard School, the main secondary school at the Dhekelia Garrison, Eastern Sovereign Base Area (ESBA).

== History ==
St. John's School was established in 1960, just after Cyprus gained independence from the British. The school celebrated its 50th anniversary in 2010. It was founded to exclusively educate children within the military community but has since opened its doors to a small number of local English-speaking expatriate children.

St John's School opened in April 1960 with a pupil population of 36, the only secondary provision prior to that time being in the Retained Site of Berengaria, within Polemidhia Village, Limassol. Two years later, all secondary pupils were attending St John's and the original buildings were proving inadequate for the pupil numbers. Teaching staff numbered 32 in 1962 and had grown to over 100 in 1974. Similarly, pupil numbers of 500 had grown to 1,500 and the initial two-storey school building was surrounded by a huge number of Cyprus and Twynham huts. All that remains of the original St Johns now is the Episkopi Primary School hall.

The current buildings were in the course of construction when the Cypriot coup d'état and subsequent Turkish invasion of Cyprus took place in July 1974 and had enormous impact upon the school. As the headteacher, Mr D A Ellery, reported in the 1975 school magazine, "much of our energy this school year has been expended in placing over 1,000 pupils and 50% of our staff in schools in the United Kingdom".

The new buildings were occupied in 1975 – with 400 pupils and 45 staff. Part of the school had been reallocated to Episkopi Primary School which moved to a new location, having previously been some distance away. Huge reductions in the number of service personnel in Episkopi and Akrotiri, and the withdrawal of families from Limassol, meant that whilst the pupil numbers steadied and grew slightly, they never again reached the huge population of 1974.

Sport has always been prominent, as has music and drama, and the ability to take part in The Duke of Edinburgh Award scheme. The comprehensive nature of the school's organisation gave opportunities to all, and the curricular support given by SCEA and then the SCE to successive headteachers and staff ensured appropriate development in line with UK schools.

In 2009, St John's School was federated with King Richard School in Dhekelia. In 2010, the school community celebrated the golden jubilee of St John's and many former pupils travelled from around the world to join in the celebrations. Both schools continue to serve the needs of British Forces Cyprus.

== Academics and school activities ==
Like all SCE schools, St. John's follows the National Curriculum and is regulated by Ofsted. In the 2014 inspection it was rated good with outstanding features. Sporting and extra-curricular activities are often run in partnership with King Richard School, such as sports day, swimming gala and ski trip.

== See also ==
- Education in Cyprus
- List of schools in Cyprus
