= Pergamos, Cyprus =

Pergamos: Πέργαμος (Greek); Beyarmudu (Turkish)
- Location in Cyprus
- Coordinates: 35°2′34″N 33°42′25″E
- Country (de jure): Cyprus
  - District: Larnaca District
- Country (de facto): Northern Cyprus
  - District: Gazimağusa District
- Established: 1980

Government
  - Mayor: İlker Edip

Population (2011)
  - Total: 1,196
  - Municipality: 4,125
- Time zone: UTC+2 (EET)
  - Summer (DST): UTC+3 (EEST)
- Website: Turkish Cypriot municipality

Pergamos (Greek: Πέργαμoς; Turkish: Beyarmudu) is a Turkish Cypriot village in Larnaca District, Cyprus, 4 km north of Pyla, almost surrounded by the British Sovereign Base Area (SBA) at Dhekelia. Pergamos is under the de facto control of Northern Cyprus.

Under Ottoman rule it was in the Caza of Famagusta and initially remained so under British rule. Around 1920 it was moved to Larnaca District.

== Name ==
The origin of the name is uncertain and may be associated with ancient Pergamon in Asia Minor or Bergamo in the Venice region of Italy. Considering the Venetians settled in Cyprus before the Ottomans, it is highly possible they are the ancestors of the Turkish Cypriots of Pergamos. The Turkish Cypriot name became Beyarmudu in 1958, meaning lord's pear. Pergamos was actually called Pergama and is visible on a map which was published by Jacomo Franco in Venice 1570. Origin of word “Bergamot”: French bergamote, from Italian bergamotta, from Ottoman Turkish bey armudu, lord's pear (equivalent to modern Turkish bey armudu) : bey-lord; see bey + armut, armud-, pear (from Persian amrūd, from Middle Persian ūrmōd) + -u, possessive suff.]

== Demographics ==
Pergamos had a population of 87 in 1881 (first British census). During the British period it was almost solely inhabited by Turkish Cypriots, which it remains. In 1960 there were 826 inhabitants, all Turkish Cypriots. In 2011 the population was 1,196, a slight decrease from 1,270 in 2006. Some Turkish Cypriots who were displaced to Pergamos during the 1960s have remained since in the village.

== Current conditions ==
Apart from the area within the SBA, it lies within the Turkish sector under the De facto control of Northern Cyprus, in the new Famagusta district of the Turkish Cypriots.

Pergamos is the site of a Green Line crossing checkpoint. That and the proximity of the SBA has assisted economic development in the area.

== International relations ==
=== Twin towns – sister cities ===
Pergamos is twinned with:

- Sarıyer, Istanbul, Turkey
- Kepez, Antalya, Turkey
- Karaman, Turkey (since 2013)
