= British Forces Cyprus =

- British Armed Forces tri-service badge
- Active: 1960 (as British Forces Near East) – present
- Country: United Kingdom
- Branch: Royal Navy; British Army; Royal Air Force
- Type: Joint tri-service command
- Role: Command of British military forces on Cyprus
- Size: 3,500 military personnel 7,000 civilians
- Part of: Cyber & Specialist Operations Command
- Headquarters: Episkopi Station, Western Sovereign Base Area
- Website: Official website

Commanders
- Commander British Forces Cyprus: Major General Tom Bewick
- Notable commanders: Air vice-marshal Michael Wigston (2015–2017)

Aircraft flown
- Multirole helicopter: Jupiter HC2

British Forces Cyprus (BFC) is the name given to the British Armed Forces stationed in the UK Sovereign Base Areas of Akrotiri and Dhekelia on the island of Cyprus and at a number of related 'retained sites' in the Republic of Cyprus. The United Kingdom retains a military presence on the island in order to keep a strategic location at the eastern end of the Mediterranean, for use as a staging point for forces sent to locations in the Middle East and Asia. BFC is a tri-service command, with all three services based on the island reporting to it.

== History ==
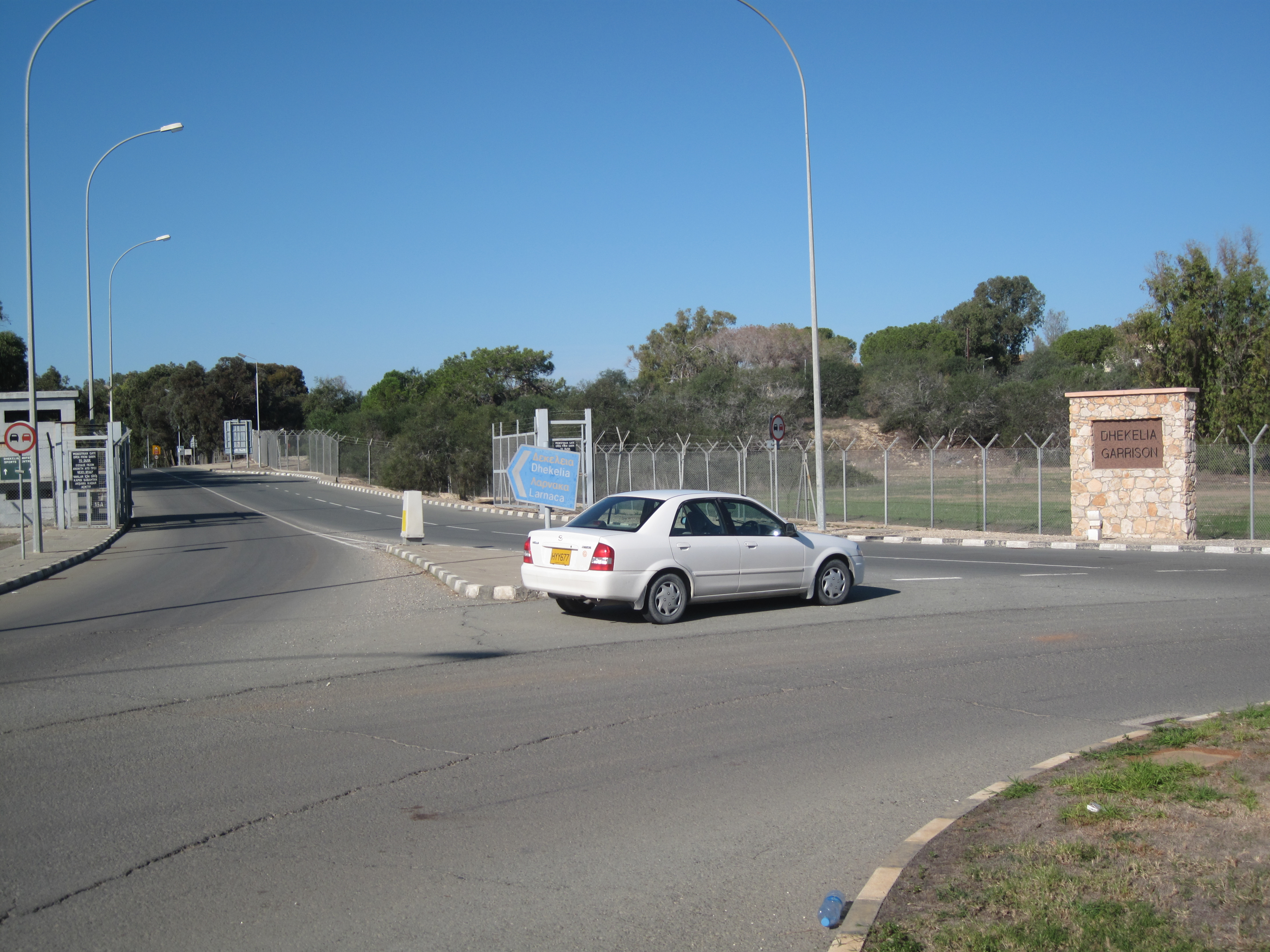
Dhekelia Garrison

Following the establishment of the Republic of Cyprus in 1960, the UK retained two Sovereign Base Areas in Akrotiri and Dhekelia and an RAF air marshal was appointed as the Administrator of the Sovereign Base Areas. The Treaty of Establishment also provided British access to 40 'retained sites' in the republic of Cyprus; these included numerous radar stations, several ports, a range of accommodation and support facilities and a firing range. In March of the following year British Forces Near East was created, the command of which was then held concurrently with that of the post of Administrator.

On 1 March 1961, the Southern Group of Middle East Air Force became Near East Air Force and was based in Cyprus. By 1962, the title British Forces in Cyprus was in official use. In 1976, as part of a Foreign and Commonwealth Office brief in preparation for the visit of the CENTO Secretary-General to the UK, it was recorded that:

..two Vulcan medium bomber squadrons, one Lightning all-weather fighter squadron, one Hercules transport squadron and one Whirlwind helicopter squadron were stationed on the island. It would be very difficult to relocate these forces and their training facilities to a base in a CENTO member state since an agreement would have to be negotiated. Besides, the United Kingdom would also have to pay the host nation for facilities granted. The sites in Cyprus were guarded by one infantry battalion, defended by a Bloodhound anti-aircraft missile squadron and one armoured car squadron. In fact, the Vulcans based at Akrotiri were 'the only declared nuclear force in CENTO' and the island played a unique part in the capacity of the air route of CENTO for the transfer of forces east of Suez in times of war. The radar sites and the fighter squadron were considered an extension of the NATO air defence system."

British Forces Cyprus retains the right to use 13 retained sites with the remaining 27 having been returned to Cyprus after the Ministry of Defence no longer required them. The most recent sites to be returned were the Berengaria Married Quarters in 2011, because they had become obsolete and the firing range on the Akamas peninsula in 1999-2001. Its training value was deemed less important than the environmental damage inflicted on an ecologically important area and the consequent political liability to British Forces Cyprus.

== Force structure ==
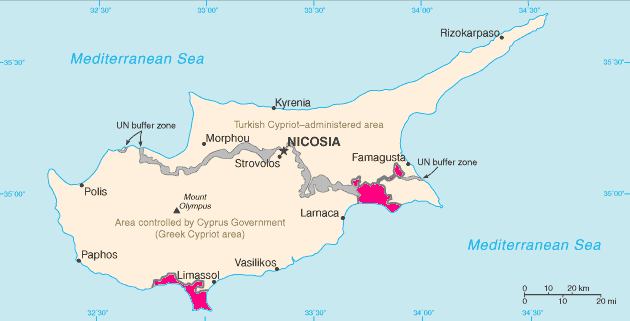
UK Sovereign Base Areas (pink)

Episkopi is the current location of Headquarters British Forces Cyprus. Commander British Forces Cyprus (CBF) and Administrator of the Sovereign Base Areas is a two-star appointment, alternating every three years between a British Army major-general and a Royal Air Force air vice-marshal. Consequently, the Chief of Staff British Forces Cyprus (COS) is a one-star appointment from the opposite service of the commander.

Episkopi Cantonment is home to the Sovereign Base Areas Administration, the civilian authority in the territory.

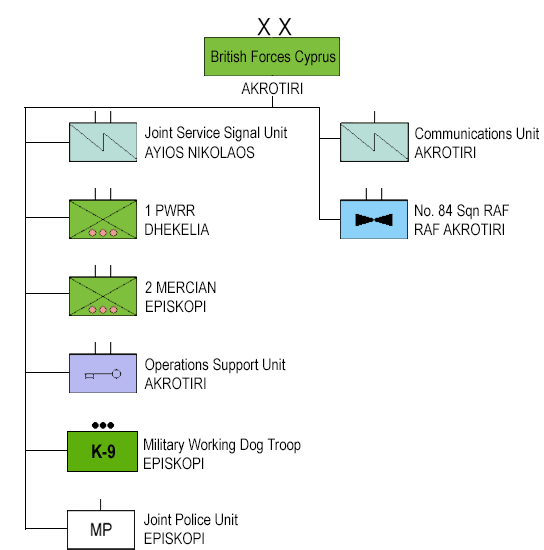
July 2020 organisation of British Forces Cyprus.

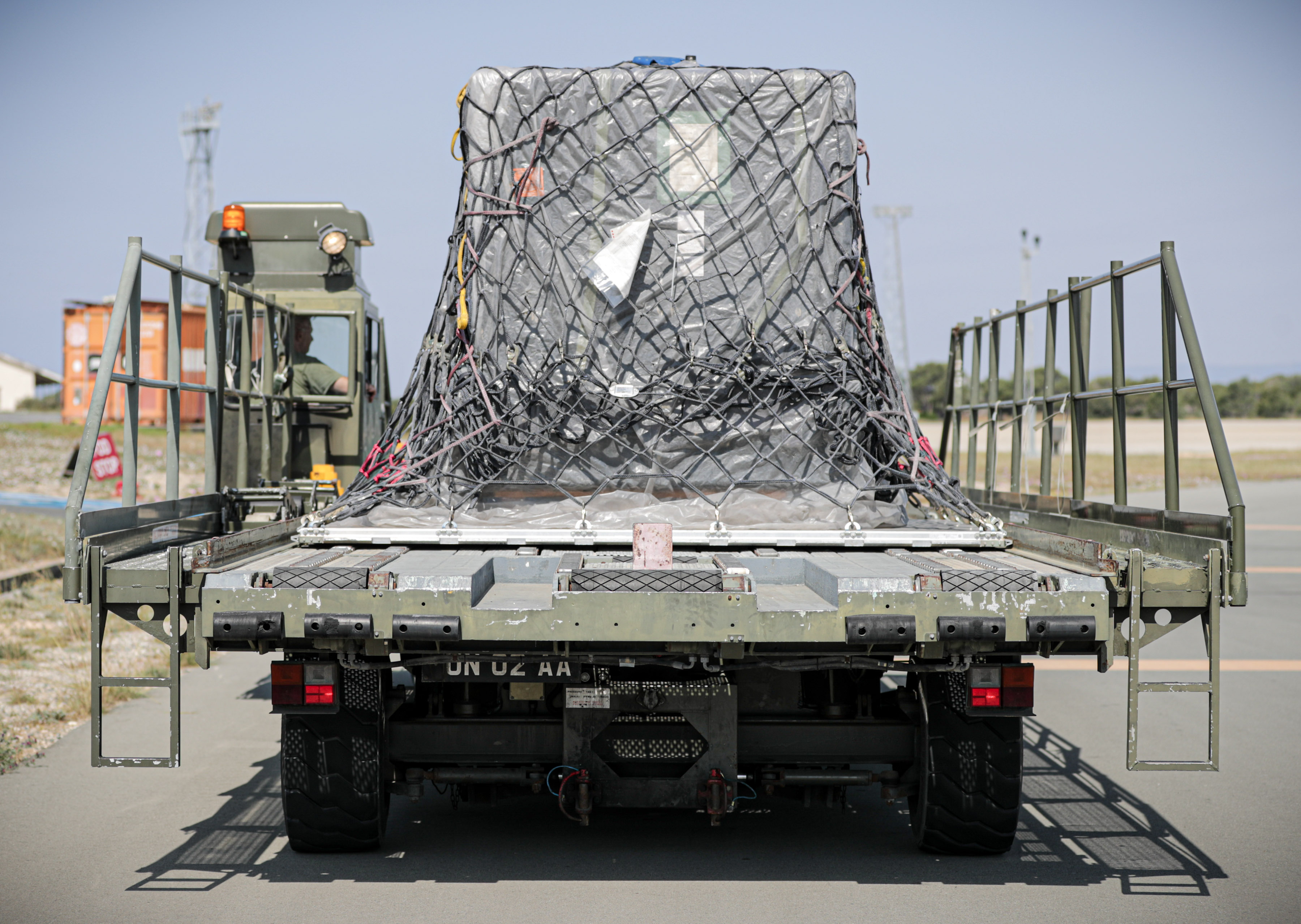
Atlas pallet loader of Joint Movement Squadron at Akrotiri

Within British Forces Cyprus are a number of permanently based units; however, the large proportion of British forces in Cyprus are rotated between Cyprus and the UK:

- Permanent Units
  - HQ, British Forces Cyprus
  - Joint Service Signal Unit (Cyprus) (Ayios Nikolaos Station)
    - Regimental Headquarters
    - 840 Signal Squadron RAF
    - Engineering Squadron
    - Support Squadron
  - Cyprus Communications Unit (an amalgamation of 12 Signals Unit RAF at Episkopi (1 June 1969 - 1 Sept 2002) & 259 Signal Squadron, Royal Signals)
  - Cyprus Operations Support Unit
    - Military Transport Squadron
    - Joint Movement Squadron
    - Joint Engineer Squadron
    - Joint Logistics Squadron
    - Air Operations Squadron
    - Cyprus Force Workshop
  - No. 84 Squadron RAF
  - Resident infantry battalions — two light role infantry battalions, one at Dhekelia and one at Episkopi, are permanently based on the island; the battalions are rotated every 2 years.
    - 1st Battalion, Welsh Guards, at Episkopi Cantonment
    - The Highlanders, 4th Battalion, Royal Regiment of Scotland, at Dhekelia Cantonment
  - Cyprus Military Working Dog Troop, Episkopi
  - Joint Service Adventure training Centre, Dhekelia
  - Cyprus Joint Police Unit (CJPU), HQ Episkopi, a Tri-Service Military Police Unit consisting of Royal Navy Police, Royal Military Police and RAF Police.
    - 1 Platoon CJPU — Dhekelia
    - 2 Platoon CJPU — Episkopi
- Civilian Components
  - Sovereign Base Areas Customs
  - Sovereign Base Areas Police
  - Security Force Police
- Public Health and Environmental Health Services
  - Joint Services Health Unit (Formed in 1958)
    - HQ Akrotiri
    - No. 1 detachment RAF Akrotiri
    - No. 2 detachment Episkopi
    - No. 4 detachment Dhekelia

The Queen's and King's Divisions continue to rotate battalions through Cyprus every three years.

== Commanders ==
The following officers have been in command of British Forces Cyprus:

=== General Officer Commanding Cyprus District ===
- 18 March 1955 — Major-General Abdy Ricketts
- 19 October 1956 — Major-General Douglas Kendrew
- 11 October 1958 — Major-General Kenneth Darling

=== Commander, British Forces in Cyprus ===
- 16 August 1960 — Air Marshal Sir William MacDonald (Administrator of the SBAs from 1960)
- 16 July 1962 — Air Chief Marshal Sir Denis Barnett, Air Officer Commanding-in-Chief Near East and Commander British Forces in Cyprus.
- 25 September 1964 — Air Marshal T. O. Prickett; Air Vice-Marshal T. O. Prickett CB, DSO, DFC, was "appointed Air Officer Commanding-in-Chief Near East Air Force and Commander, British Forces in Cyprus, with the acting rank of Air Marshal in succession to" Air Chief Marshal Barnett, 25 Sept 1964.
- 21 November 1966 — Air Marshal E. G. Jones "appointed Air Officer Commanding-in-Chief Near East Air Force and Commander, British Forces in Cyprus, with the acting rank of Air Marshal in succession to Air Marshal Sir Thomas Prickett"
- 6 May 1969 — Air Marshal D. G. Smallwood
- 2 July 1970 — Air Marshal W. D. Hodgkinson, Commander, British Forces Near East; AOC in C, Near East Air Force; Administrator, Sovereign Base Areas of Akrotiri and Dhekelia
- 25 June 1973 — Air Marshal Sir John Aiken as Commander, British Forces Near East and Air Officer Commanding-in-Chief Near East Air Force Still Commander British Forces Near East in 1974.

=== Commander, British Forces Cyprus ===
- 1 April 1976 — Air Vice-Marshal R. D. Austen-Smith as Commander, British Forces Cyprus/Air Commander, Cyprus and, Administrator, British Sovereign Base Areas - Cyprus on 1 April 1976;
- 28 April 1978 — Major-General W. R. Taylor
- 3 October 1980 — Air Vice-Marshal R. L. Davis
- 31 March 1983 — Major-General Sir Desmond Langley
- 29 October 1985 — Air Vice-Marshal K. W. Hayr
- 21 April 1988 — Major-General J. P. W. Friedberger
- 1990 — Air Vice-Marshal A. F. C. Hunter
- 25 March 1993 — Major-General A. G. H. Harley
- 17 February 1995 — Air Vice-Marshal P. Millar
- 16 January 1998 — Major-General A. I. Ramsay
- 5 September 2000 — Air Vice-Marshal T. W. Rimmer
- 5 September 2003 — Major-General P. T. C. Pearson
- 26 April 2006 — Air Vice-Marshal R. H. Lacey
- 16 October 2008 — Major-General J. H. Gordon
- 4 November 2010 — Air Vice-Marshal G. E. Stacey
- 3 January 2012 — Major-General R. Cripwell
- 20 January 2015 — Air Vice-Marshal M. Wigston
- February 2017 — Major-General J. T. E. Illingworth
- 25 September 2019 – Major-General R. J. Thomson
- 1 September 2022 – Air Vice-Marshal P. J. M. Squires
- 11 April 2025 – Major-General T. H. Bewick

== Operation TOSCA ==
Operation TOSCA is the name given to the British contribution to the United Nations Peacekeeping Force in Cyprus (UNFICYP). The British Contingent (BRITCON) numbers between 200 and 300, and consists of three distinct parts:

- HQ BRITCON — responsible for the administration and support of the British Contingent.
- Force Military Police Unit — the FMPU is commanded by a major of the Royal Military Police, with seven other members of the RMP as part of the multi-national unit.
- UN Roulement Regiment — the URR has responsibility for patrolling Sector 2 of the Green Line in Nicosia.

The URR is drawn from across the Field Army, and will not necessarily be a specialist combat unit (infantry or cavalry), or even part of the Regular Army, as, since 2008, units of the Territorial Army / Army Reserve have undertaken deployments to the Green Line.

One of the roles of the support units of BFC is to assist as needed the British units deployed with UNFICYP, which are not part of BFC, but are instead under the direct command of the United Nations.

=== Units ===
Listed is the unit that provided the Regimental Headquarters and the bulk of the troops. Often soldiers from a number of Territorial Army units would also deploy as part of the force.

- April 1973 – October 1973: 1st Battalion, Parachute Regiment
- October 1973 – April 1974:
- April 1974 – October 1974: 2nd Battalion, Coldstream Guards
- October 1974 – April 1975: Queen's Royal Irish Hussars
- April 1975 – October 1975: 1st Royal Tank Regiment
- October 1975 – April 1976:
- April 1976 – October 1976:
- October 1976 – April 1977: 1st Battalion, Parachute Regiment
- April 1977 – October 1977: 1st Battalion, Royal Irish Rangers
- October 1977 – April 1978:
- April 1978 – October 1978: 1st Battalion, Royal Regiment of Fusiliers
- October 1978 – April 1979: 3rd Battalion, The Light Infantry
- April 1979 – October 1979: 41 Commando Royal Marines
- October 1979 – April 1980: 1st Battalion, The Light Infantry
- April 1980 – October 1980: 3rd Battalion, Royal Green Jackets
- October 1980 – April 1981: 3rd Battalion, Royal Anglian Regiment
- April 1981 – October 1981: 1st Battalion, Green Howards
- October 1981 – April 1982: 2nd Battalion, Queen's Regiment
- April 1982 – October 1982: 1st Battalion, Gloucestershire Regiment
- October 1982 – April 1983: 2nd Battalion, Grenadier Guards
- April 1983 – October 1983: 1st Battalion, Queen's Lancashire Regiment
- October 1983 – June 1984: 2nd Battalion, Royal Anglian Regiment
- June 1984 – December 1984:
- December 1984 – June 1985: 1st Battalion, Duke of Edinburgh's Royal Regiment (Berkshire and Wiltshire)
- June 1985 – December 1985: 2nd Battalion, Royal Irish Rangers
- December 1985 – June 1986: 2nd Battalion, Royal Regiment of Fusiliers
- June 1986 – December 1986: 3rd Battalion, Parachute Regiment
- December 1986 – June 1987: 3rd Battalion, Royal Regiment of Fusiliers
- June 1987 – December 1987: 1st Battalion, Worcestershire and Sherwood Foresters Regiment
- December 1987 – June 1988: 1st Battalion, King's Own Royal Border Regiment
- June 1988 – December 1988: 4th/7th Royal Dragoon Guards
- December 1988 – June 1989: 3rd Regiment, Royal Horse Artillery
- June 1989 – December 1989:
- December 1989 – June 1990: 2 Field Regiment, Royal Artillery
- June 1990 – December 1990: 22 Regiment, Royal Artillery
- December 1990 – June 1991: Queen's Own Hussars?
- June 1991 – December 1991:
- December 1991 – June 1992: 15th/19th The King's Royal Hussars
- June 1992 – December 1992: 5 Regiment, Royal Artillery
- December 1992 – June 1993: Queen's Royal Irish Hussars
- June 1993 – December 1993: 39 Regiment, Royal Artillery
- December 1993 – June 1994: 2nd Royal Tank Regiment
- June 1994 – December 1994: 7th Field Regiment, Royal Horse Artillery
- December 1994 – June 1995: 29 Commando Regiment, Royal Artillery and Queen's Royal Lancers
- June 1995 – December 1995:
- December 1995 – June 1996: 12 Regiment, Royal Artillery
- June 1996 – December 1996: 39 Regiment, Royal Artillery
- December 1996 – June 1997: 32 Regiment, Royal Artillery
- June 1997 – December 1997: 5 Regiment, Royal Artillery
- December 1997 – June 1998: 1st Royal Tank Regiment
- June 1998 – December 1998: 19 Regiment, Royal Artillery
- December 1998 – June 1999: 47 Regiment, Royal Artillery
- June 1999 – December 1999: 22 Regiment, Royal Artillery
- December 1999 – June 2000: 1st Battalion, Staffordshire Regiment
- June 2000 – December 2000: 16 Regiment, Royal Artillery
- December 2000 – June 2001: Queen's Royal Lancers
- June 2001 – December 2001: 12 Regiment, Royal Artillery
- December 2001 – June 2002: 32 Regiment, Royal Artillery
- June 2002 – December 2002:
- December 2002 – June 2003:
- June 2003 – December 2003: 22 Regiment, Royal Artillery
- December 2003 – June 2003: 3rd Regiment, Royal Horse Artillery
- June 2003 – December 2003:
- December 2003 – June 2004:
- June 2004 – December 2004: 40 Regiment, Royal Artillery
- December 2004 – ? 2005: 26 Regiment, Royal Artillery
- 2005: 1st Regiment, Royal Horse Artillery
- October 2007 – April 2008: 10 Queen's Own Gurkha Logistic Regiment, Royal Logistic Corps
- April 2008 – October 2008:
- October 2008 – April 2009: 32 Signal Regiment, Royal Corps of Signals (first deployment of a Territorial Army unit for the Operation)
- April 2009 – October 2009: 23 Pioneer Regiment, Royal Logistic Corps
- October 2009 – April 2010: 27 Regiment, Royal Logistic Corps
- April 2010 – October 2010: 40 Signal Regiment, Royal Corps of Signals
- October 2010 – April 2011:
- April 2011 – October 2011: 3rd Battalion, Royal Anglian Regiment
- October 2011 – April 2012: 23 Pioneer Regiment, Royal Logistic Corps
- April 2012 – October 2012: 29 Regiment, Royal Logistic Corps
- October 2012 – April 2013: 101 Force Support Battalion, Royal Electrical and Mechanical Engineers
- April 2013 – October 2013: 17 Port and Maritime Regiment, Royal Logistic Corps
- October 2013 – April 2014: 28 Engineer Regiment, Royal Engineers
- April 2014 – October 2014: 1st Battalion, Irish Guards
- October 2014 – April 2015: 2nd Battalion, Mercian Regiment
- April 2015 – October 2015: Black Watch, 3rd Battalion, Royal Regiment of Scotland
- October 2015 – April 2016: Royal Scots Borderers, 1st Battalion, Royal Regiment of Scotland
- April 2016 – October 2016: 36 Engineer Regiment, Royal Engineers
- October 2016 – April 2017: 4th Battalion, Duke of Lancaster's Regiment
- April 2017 – October 2017: 7 Regiment, Royal Logistic Corps
- October 2017 – April 2018: Royal Scots Dragoon Guards
- April 2018 – October 2018: Royal Lancers (Queen Elizabeths' Own)
- October 2018 – April 2019: 1st Battalion, Scots Guards
- April 2019 – October 2019: 4 Regiment, Royal Artillery
- October 2019 – April 2020: 27 Regiment, Royal Logistic Corps
- April 2020 – October 2020: 7th Battalion, The Rifles
- October 2020 – April 2021: 6th Battalion, The Rifles
- April 2021 – October 2021: 6 Regiment, Royal Logistic Corps
- October 2021 – April 2022: 1st Battalion, The Rifles
- April 2022 – October 2022: 21 Engineer Regiment, Royal Engineers
- October 2022 – April 2023: 10 Queen's Own Gurkha Logistic Regiment, Royal Logistics Corps
- April 2023 – October 2023: Household Cavalry Regiment
- October 2023 – April 2024: 71 Engineer Regiment, Royal Engineers
- April 2024 – October 2024: 4th Battalion, Parachute Regiment
- October 2024 – March 2025: 5th Regiment, Royal Artillery
- March 2025 – October 2025: 5th Battalion, Royal Regiment of Fusiliers
- October 2025 – March 2026: 1st Battalion, Coldstream Guards
- March 2026 – October 2026: 39 Engineer Regiment, Royal Engineers
- October 2026 - present: 8th Battalion, The Rifles

== British Forces Cyprus Installations ==
=== The Republic of Cyprus ===
In addition to the Sovereign Base Areas of Akrotiri and Dhekelia, 1960 Treaty of Establishment between the United Kingdom and the Republic of Cyprus granted the UK the right to permanently make use of 40 further sites on the island for military purposes.

Name	Part of	Country	County	Opened	Units
Berengaria Village Married Quarters	British Forces Cyprus	Cyprus	Limassol		The Harakis Borehole and the Berengaria village pipeline are also retained to supply water.
British East Mediterranean Relay Station	British Forces Cyprus	Cyprus	Zygi		Used the Foreign and Commonwealth Office to broadcast BBC World Service programming to Israel and the Arab world.
Troodos Leave Camp	British Forces Cyprus	Cyprus	Troodos	1878	The accommodation is used by BFC, visiting troops and youth services in support of adventurous training. Site also contains married-quarters, NAAFI and Works Unit. Contiguous with Troodos Station.
RAF Nicosia and Camps	British Forces Cyprus	Cyprus	Nicosia		Not currently in use because it lies in the UN Buffer Zone between Turkish-occupied Northern Cyprus and the Republic of Cyprus.
RAF Mt Olympus Radar Station	British Forces Cyprus	Cyprus	Troodos		A British Longrange Radar Station operating on Mt Olympus' Peak.
Troodos Station	British Forces Cyprus	Cyprus	Troodos	1878	A remote Signals Station.
Kissousa Headwaters, Reservoir and Pumping Station	British Forces Cyprus	Cyprus	Limassol		A secure water supply for the Akrioti Sovereign Base Area

=== Occupied Northern Cyprus ===
Three retained Military facilities are located within the territory of occupied northern Cyprus. They are not currently in use by British Forces Cyprus because the UK does not acknowledge the self proclaimed government of Northern Cyprus.

Name	Part of	Country	County	Opened	Units
Famagusta Joint Services Port Utility	British Forces Cyprus	Northern Cyprus	Famagusta		Lies in Northern Cyprus and therefore not currently in use.
Famagusta Family Shop and NAAFI HQ	British Forces Cyprus	Northern Cyprus	Famagusta		Lies in Northern Cyprus and therefore not currently in use.
Famagusta NAAFI Transport Yard	British Forces Cyprus	Northern Cyprus	Famagusta		Lies in Northern Cyprus and therefore not currently in use.

=== Sovereign Base Areas of Akrotiri and Dhekelia ===
The two British enclaves in the Republic of Cyprus, act as platforms for the projection of British military assets in the Eastern Mediterranean and the Middle East. The enclaves serve as centres for regional communications monitoring from the eastern Mediterranean through the Middle East to Iran. Facilities within the retained areas also support British military activities on retained sites in the Republic of Cyprus and provide unique training opportunities.

Western Sovereign Base Area

Name	Part of	Country	Region	Opened	Units
Episkopi Cantonment	British Forces Cyprus	Sovereign Base Areas of Akrotiri and Dhekelia	Western Sovereign Base Area	1960	Home to HQ British Forces Cyprus
Paramali North and South Quarters	British Forces Cyprus	Sovereign Base Areas of Akrotiri and Dhekelia	Western Sovereign Base Area	1960	
RAF Akrotiri	British Forces Cyprus	Sovereign Base Areas of Akrotiri and Dhekelia	Western Sovereign Base Area	1960	The Largest Royal Air Force Station outside the UK.

Eastern Sovereign Base Area

Name	Part of	Country	Region	Opened	Units
Alexander Barracks	British Forces Cyprus	Sovereign Base Areas of Akrotiri and Dhekelia	Eastern Sovereign Base Area	1960	
Ayios Nikolaos Station	British Forces Cyprus	Sovereign Base Areas of Akrotiri and Dhekelia	Eastern Sovereign Base Area	1960	The Joint Service Signal Unit (JSSU). JSSU is a static communications organisation maintaining secure links from Cyprus to the rest of the world. The station is a significant centre for GCHQ collection of signals data and intelligence from the Eastern Mediterranean Region and Middle East.
Kingsfield Airfield	British Forces Cyprus	Sovereign Base Areas of Akrotiri and Dhekelia	Eastern Sovereign Base Area		A small airfield whose primary employment is as a British Army Helicopter Base.
Dhekelia Cantonment	British Forces Cyprus	Sovereign Base Areas of Akrotiri and Dhekelia	Eastern Sovereign Base Area	1960	Headquarters of the Eastern Sovereign Base Area, a resident infantry battalion, an engineer squadron, and various logistic units, as well as UK-based civilians and dependents.
Nightingale Barracks	British Forces Cyprus	Sovereign Base Areas of Akrotiri and Dhekelia	Eastern Sovereign Base Area		

== See also ==
- Cyprus Seven Trial
- Episkopi Cantonment
- Sovereign Base Areas
