= Dhekelia Cantonment =

Military base in Akrotiri and Dhekelia

- Φρουρά Δεκέλειας (Greek); Dikelya Kantonu (Turkish)
- Akrotiri and Dhekelia, Cyprus
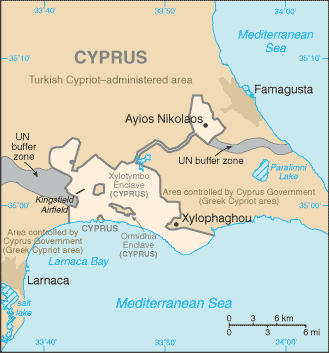

Site information
- Type: Military base
- Controlled by: (United Kingdom) British Forces Cyprus

Location
- Coordinates: 35°01′03″N 33°46′24″E

Garrison information
- Occupants: The Highlanders, 4th Battalion, Royal Regiment of Scotland

Dhekelia Cantonment (Greek: Φρουρά Δεκέλειας, Turkish: Dikelya Kantonu), also simply named Dhekelia, is a military base in Akrotiri and Dhekelia, a British Overseas Territory on the island of Cyprus, administered as the Sovereign Base Areas. It is the larger of the two British military bases on the island, and it is also the location of Alexander Barracks, which is home to the 2nd Battalion, The Princess of Wales's Royal Regiment. In Autumn 2017, the 2nd Battalion Royal Anglian Regiment deployed to Dhekelia replacing 2nd Battalion, The Princess of Wales's Royal Regiment.

It forms a part of British Forces Cyprus.

Dhekelia contains the village of Dasaki Achnas and a portion of the village Pergamos, and also includes several Cypriot enclaves including Xylotymbo, Ormidhia and Dhekelia Power Station. However, the cantonment expands out more northeast with a 90m wide narrow corridor, which leads to even more Dhekelian land which includes Ayios Nikolaos Station and a Green Line crossing point.

The cantonment is also referred to as the Eastern Sovereign Base Area.

== See also ==
- British Forces Cyprus
- Episkopi Cantonment
- Episkopi, Limassol
- Royal Military Police
- Sovereign Base Areas
- Sovereign Base Areas Customs
- Sovereign Base Areas Police
- St. John's School
