= Sovereign Base Areas Customs and Immigration =

Customs agency of the UK's Sovereign Base Areas

- Headquarters: SBAA, Episkopi Garrison
- Fiscal Officer: James Coates
- Head Customs & Immigration: Adam Chatfield

HM Revenue & Customs

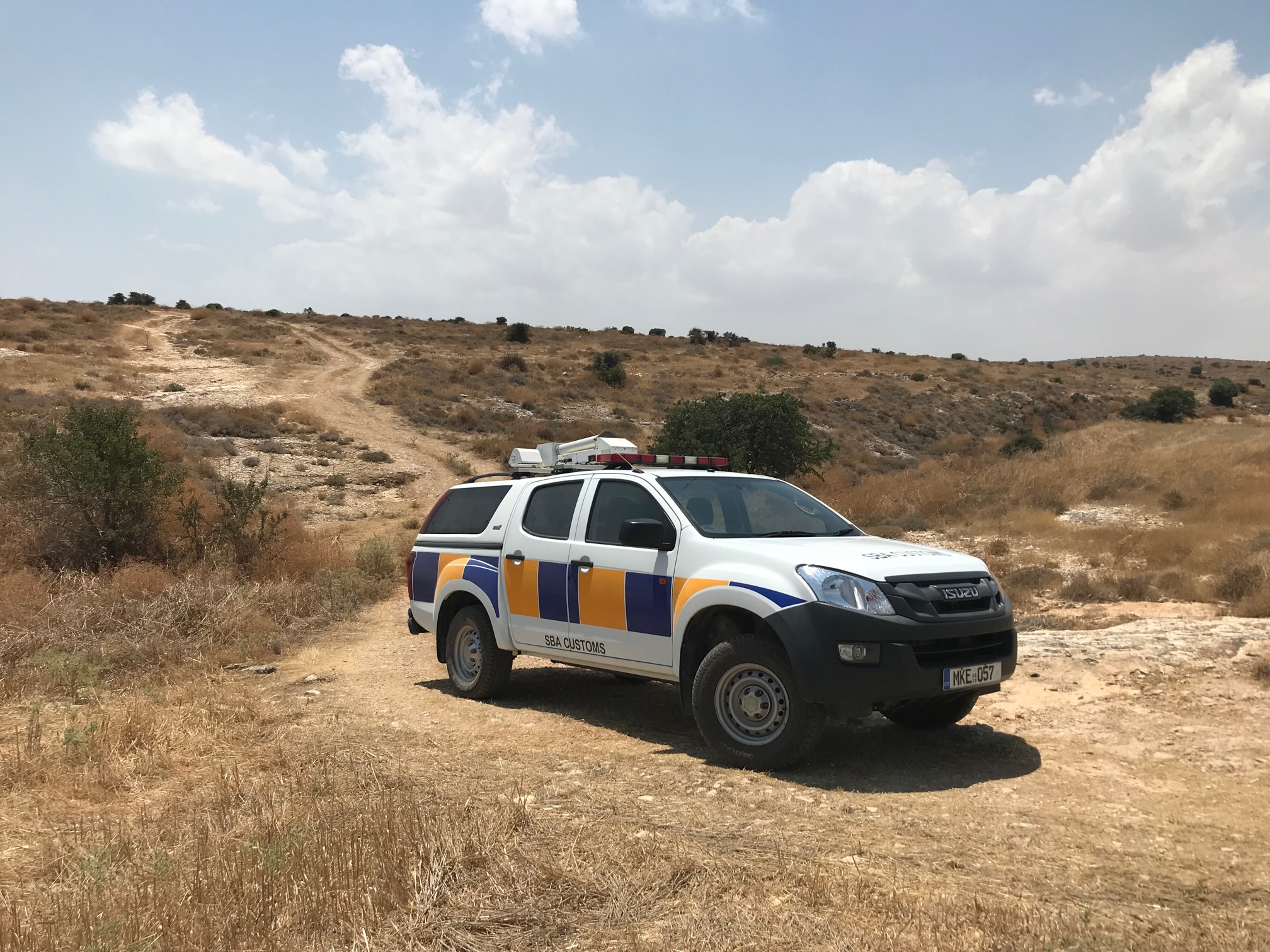
SBA Customs vehicle

Sovereign Base Areas Customs and Immigration is an immigration and customs authority that has jurisdiction over Akrotiri and Dhekelia, a British Overseas Territory on the island of Cyprus, administered as a Sovereign Base Area, and home to British Forces Cyprus. It is managed by the Ministry of Defence (MoD) and around 3,500 military personnel are posted there at any one time.

In contrast with other customs forces, the SBA Customs has a much wider role of responsibility, like most branches within the territory, administrating many areas including immigration, imports, exports, tax, births, marriages, divorces, and deaths.

== Overview ==
The senior and local management officers are on loan from HMRC and Border Force in the UK, and assist with operational management and training and development of the locally employed officers of SBA Customs and Immigration service. SBACI officers monitor two crossing points at Pergamos and Strovilia in the Eastern Sovereign Base Area at the Green Line Border between the Republic of Cyprus and occupied northern Cyprus. Between the North and South areas of the island there are formal customs and immigration controls at these crossing points and the UN Buffer Zone remains along most part of the Green Line. SBA Customs and Immigration are involved in preventing smuggling and illegal immigration into SBA territory. There are mobile patrols along the ESBA section of the Green line and training exercises and operations are accomplished with the cooperation of SBA Police and UK military units based in Cyprus at the time.

Businesses based within territory must be licensed by SBA Customs and Immigration to conduct trade and there are guidelines and restrictions for various types of business. The administration produces birth, marriage and death certificates for UK dependants based within the territory.

Working in unison with the Cyprus Joint Maritime Unit comprising the Royal Navy Cyprus Squadron and 417 Maritime of the RLC, the Sovereign Base Area Administration (SBAA) operate a combined maritime unit comprising joint working of SBA Police and SBA Customs and Immigration to operate patrols within territorial waters and along the coastline within the territory to prevent illegal immigration, illegal fishing, and smuggling. Their enforcement has allowed for the fish reserve at Akrotiri to remain well stocked as due to extensive over-fishing much of the fish life in the waters in other areas of the island is low in numbers. SBA Customs liaise with UK military resources and the Republic of Cyprus Government Departments to combat pollution in SBA waters and along the coastline whilst controlling ports and fisheries. The Fiscal Officer is also designated the King's harbourmaster of the mole in Akrotiri and Dhekelia.

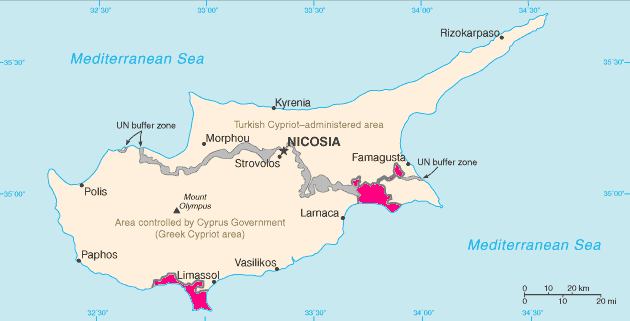
The Sovereign Base Areas are shown in red, and are where the SBA Customs operate.

== Personnel ==
SBA Customs and Immigration officers are a uniformed organisation and wear a uniform with the style of Royal Naval rank insignia but are distinguished by a cap badge which contains the portcullis underneath the St Edward's Crown, enclosed within a pair of golden fronds. The ranks of SBA Customs are worn as follows: the fiscal officer wears the insignia of a RN commander whilst the deputy fiscal officer and officer in charge at Dhekelia wear the rank braid of RN lieutenant commander. Locally employed uniformed operational officers at RAF Akrotiri and the military station at Dhekelia and the ESBA crossing points wear badges of rank with one or two rings of braid according to their substantive grade.

== Responsibilities ==
SBA Customs and Immigration control tax-free imports at the airports and the crossing points within the territory by regulating the value and amount of goods such as cigarettes or alcohol that can be carried through the control and entry points without declaration. The main airport is RAF Akrotiri which has regular flights to and from the UK and the Middle East. The SBAs in Cyprus also provide the opportunity for a stop off point for 36 hours for soldiers that have recently experienced combat to participate in decompression activity before returning home. In April 2004 over 100,000 cigarettes were seized and the largest isolated attempt to smuggle cigarettes involved a Turkish Cypriot man from Lapithos, who tried to smuggle a total of 29,200 across the Pergamos checkpoint near Larnaca.

SBA Customs and Immigration regulate the sale of goods with limited imported stocks at Ermes stores on the island which supply the British residents with products all tax-free to entitled persons serving in the SBAs. SBACI also control the messes and clubs. All mail posted to BFPO addresses on the island is subject to inspection by the SBA Customs and they can, for example, question the legitimacy of parcels marked as "gifts" and charge duties and tax as appropriate.

== Ranks ==
Ranks of the SBA Customs
Commander; The Fiscal Officer	Lieutenant-Commander; Deputy Fiscal Officer; Officer in Charge of Dhekalia	Grade 1 Officer/ Team Leader	Grade 2 Officer

== Operating procedure ==
The territory of Akrotiri and Dhekelia was formed in 1960 as a military base to be administered as a British Sovereign Base Area rather than an ordinary colonial territory. In a declaration by Her Majesty's Government in 'Appendix O' to the 1960 treaty with Cyprus, the Sovereign Base Areas Administration have to follow specific rules of governance to which the SBA Customs and Immigration enforces and adheres to including:

- Not to develop the Sovereign Base Areas for other than military purposes.
- Not to set up and administer "colonies".
- Not to create customs posts or other frontier barriers between the Sovereign Base Areas and the Republic.
- Not to set up or permit the establishment of civilian commercial or industrial enterprises except insofar as these are connected with military requirements, and not otherwise to impair the economic commercial or industrial unity and life of the Island.
- Not to establish commercial or civilian seaports or airports.
- Not to allow new settlement of people in the Sovereign Base Areas other than for temporary purposes.
- Not to expropriate private property within the Sovereign Base Areas except for military purposes on payment of fair compensation.

The bases have their own legal system, distinct from the UK and Cyprus. This consists of the laws of the Colony of Cyprus as at August 1960, amended as necessary. The laws of Akrotiri and Dhekelia are kept, as far as possible, the same as the laws of Cyprus. The Court of the Sovereign Base Areas is concerned with non-military offences committed by any person within Akrotiri and Dhekelia, and law and order is maintained by the Sovereign Base Areas Police, while military law is upheld by the Cyprus Joint Police Unit.

== See also ==
- Visa policy of the British Overseas Territories#Akrotiri and Dhekelia
- Akrotiri and Dhekelia
- British Overseas Territories
- Crown Dependencies
- Customs
- Cyprus Police
- HM Revenue & Customs
- Inland Revenue
- Sovereign Base Areas
