= Akrotiri and Dhekelia =

British Overseas Territory on Cyprus

Coordinates: 34°35′N 32°59′E

Sovereign Base Areas of Akrotiri and Dhekelia
- British Overseas Territory
- Flag Seal
- Anthem: "God Save the King" (Note: "God Save the King" is the national anthem by custom, not statute, and there is no authorised version. Typically only the first verse is sung, although the second verse is also often sung as well at state and public events. The words King, he, him, his, used at present, are replaced by Queen, she, her when the monarch is female.)
- Location of Akrotiri and Dhekelia (deep pink)

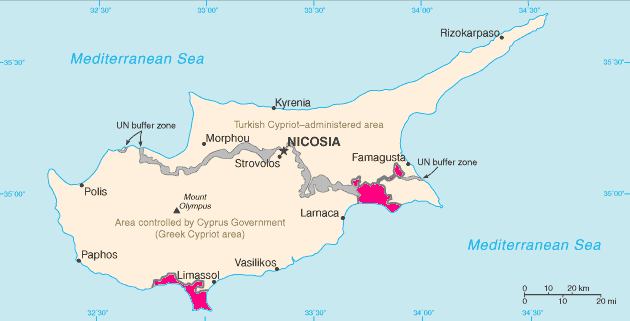
- Location of Akrotiri (southwest) and Dhekelia (southeast) in deep pink on Cyprus
- Sovereignty: United Kingdom
- Treaty of Establishment: 16 August 1960
- Capital: Episkopi Cantonment
- Largest civilian settlement: Akrotiri
- Official languages: English
- Common languages: Cypriot Greek • Cypriot Turkish
- Government: ex officio stratocratic dependency under a constitutional monarchy
  - Monarch: Charles III
  - Administrator (as Commander of the British Forces Cyprus): Major General Tom Bewick ex officio

Government of the United Kingdom
  - Minister: Stewart Wood

Area
  - Total: 254 km^{2} (98 sq mi)
  - Akrotiri: 123 km^{2} (47 sq mi)
  - Dhekelia: 131 km^{2} (51 sq mi)

Population
  - 2020 estimate: 18,195 (not ranked)
- Currency: Euro (€) (EUR)
- Time zone: UTC+02:00 (EET)
  - Summer (DST): UTC+03:00 (EEST)
- Driving side: Left
- Calling code: +357
- Postal codes in Cyprus UK postcode: 3370 (Akrotiri); 6370 (Dhekelia); BFPO 57 / BF1 2AT (Akrotiri); BFPO 58 / BF1 2AU (Dhekelia)

Akrotiri and Dhekelia (/ˌækroʊˈtɪəri ənd dɪˈkeɪli.ə/ AK-row-TIER-ee and dih-KAY-lee-ə, Greek: Ακρωτήρι και Δεκέλεια, Turkish: Ağrotur ve Dikelya), officially the Sovereign Base Areas of Akrotiri and Dhekelia (SBAs), is a British Overseas Territory that consists of two separate areas on the island of Cyprus. The areas, which include British military bases and installations that were formerly part of the Crown colony of Cyprus, were retained by the British under the 1960 treaty of independence signed by the United Kingdom, Greece, Turkey, the president of Cyprus and the representative of the Turkish Cypriot community.

British Forces Cyprus are stationed on this territory, including Ayios Nikolaos Station for signals intelligence.

Despite being under British control, Akrotiri and Dhekelia are integrated with the surrounding Cypriot communities and economies. The areas are notable for their strategic geopolitical value and rich environmental features, including the Akrotiri Salt Lake, a protected wetland. Education, policing, and healthcare services are provided in coordination with the Republic of Cyprus. The SBAs also play a significant role in intelligence and communications operations across the Eastern Mediterranean. Although not part of the European Union post-Brexit, the areas continue to be governed by protocols that align with certain EU laws to avoid disrupting the daily lives of residents.

== History ==
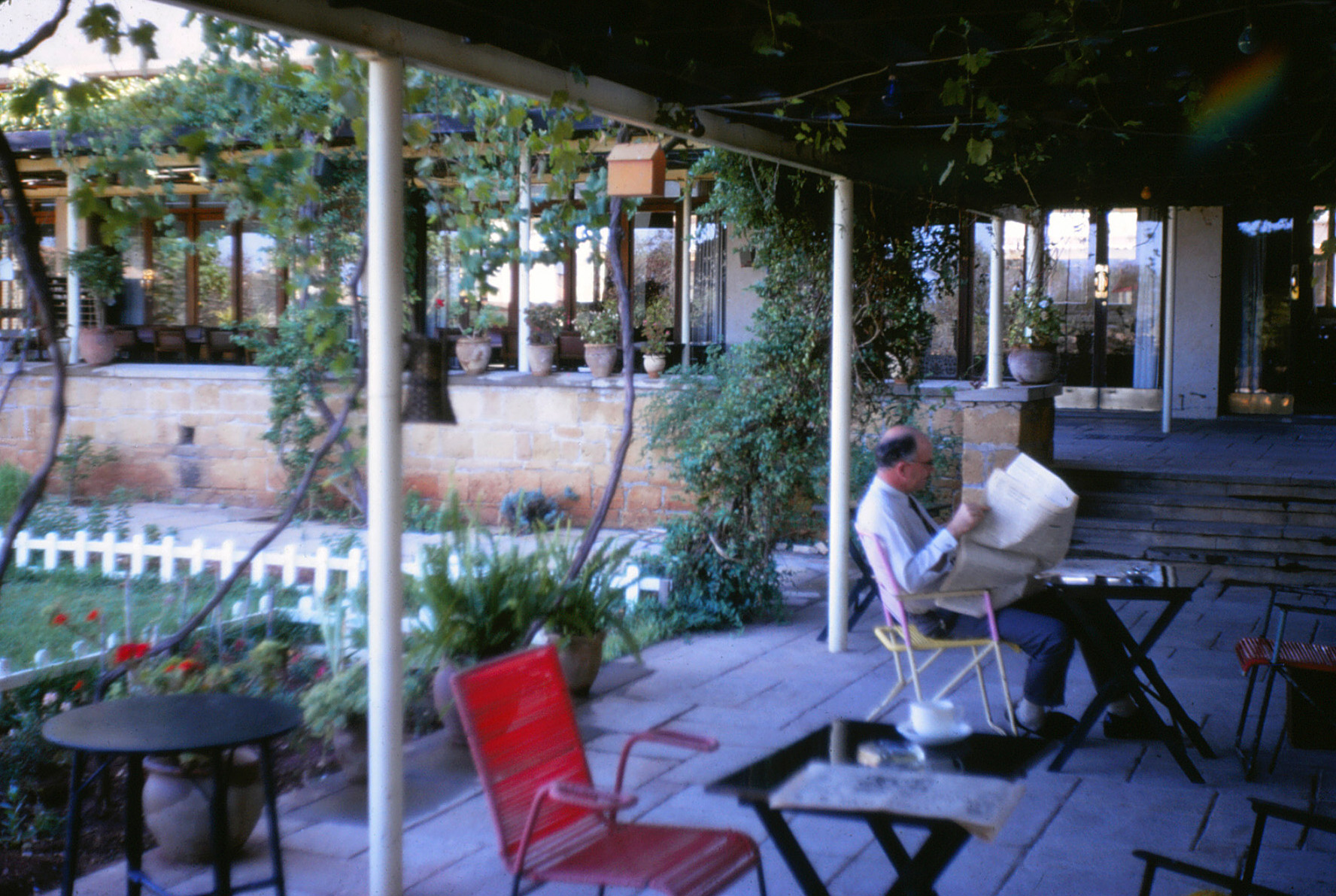
Inside the officers' mess, March 1969

The Sovereign Base Areas were created in 1960 by the London and Zürich Agreements, when Cyprus achieved independence from the British Empire, as recorded by the United Nations in 1960 as treaty 5476. The United Kingdom desired to retain sovereignty over these areas, as this guaranteed the use of UK military bases on Cyprus, including Royal Air Force (RAF) Akrotiri, and a garrison of the British Army. The importance of the bases to the British is based on the strategic location of the island, at the eastern edge of the Mediterranean, close to the Suez Canal and the Middle East; the ability to use the RAF base as staging post for military aircraft; and for training.

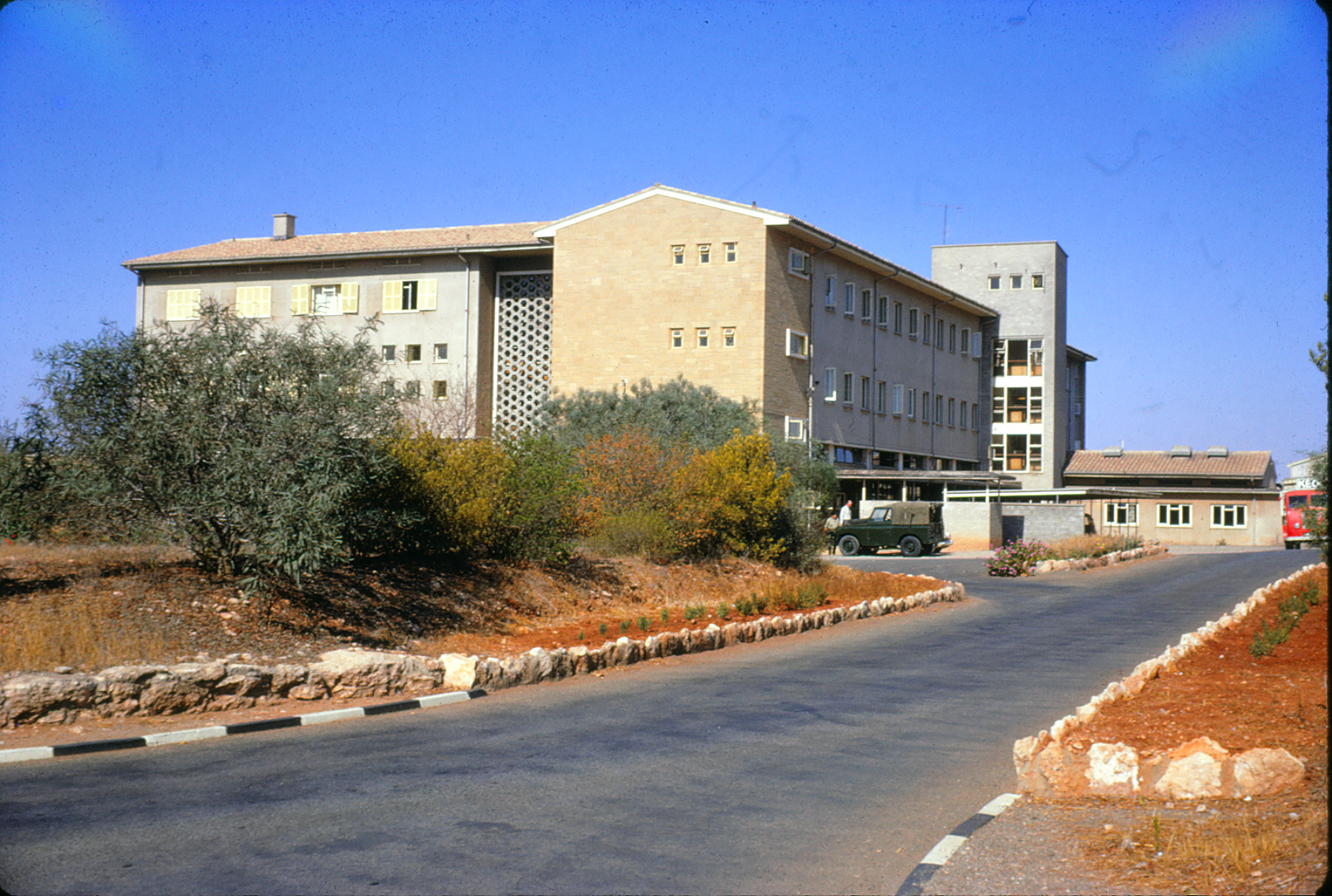
Garrison officers' mess Dhekelia, 1969

In July and August 1961, there were a series of bomb attacks against the pipeline carrying fresh water to the Dhekelia Sovereign Base Area. The pipeline was breached by explosions twelve times.

In the early 1970s, the United States built an over-the-horizon radar named Cobra Shoe, which could observe aeroplane operations and missile tests in southern Russia. This was operated by the RAF on behalf of the U.S. Air Force. This augmented an earlier British system built in the early 1960s named Project Sandra. The American use of the base was hidden from the Cypriot government due to sensitivities between governments.

In July 1974, following a military coup by the Cypriot National Guard, Turkey invaded the north of Cyprus, leading to the establishment of the internationally unrecognized Turkish Republic of Northern Cyprus. This did not affect the status of the bases. Greek Cypriots fleeing from the Turkish forces were permitted to travel through the Dhekelia Sovereign Base Area and were given humanitarian aid, with those from Achna setting up a new village (Dasaki Achnas or Achna Forest) which is still in the Dhekelia Sovereign Base Area.

The Turkish advance halted when it reached the edge of the Dhekelia Sovereign Base Area to avoid military conflict with the United Kingdom. In the Akrotiri Sovereign Base Area a tented refugee camp was set up at "Happy Valley", part of the Episkopi Cantonment, to house Turkish Cypriots fleeing from Limassol and the villages surrounding the Area. In 1975, they were flown out of RAF Akrotiri via Turkey to northern Cyprus. Some Greek Cypriot refugees remain housed on land in the parts of Trachoni and Kolossi villages that fall within the Akrotiri Sovereign Base Area.

As a result of the Turkish invasion, the British Government reinforced its military presence in the Sovereign Base Areas on Cyprus. While some reports suggest that prior to the invasion, the Government was looking to reduce Britain's presence on the island, following the invasion that proved to be strategically difficult. Hence the British military presence remained on the island for the next fifty years.

On 1 March 2026, as part of the 2026 Iran war, the base at Akrotiri was subject to a drone strike. This happened after British Prime Minister Keir Starmer granted permission for U.S. forces to use the bases in the strikes. No casualties were reported and only minor damage was sustained on the base's runway. The government of Cyprus, in coordination with British Forces Cyprus ordered the evacuation of residents in the area, with a SBA announcement telling British dependents and Cypriot citizens living there evacuate to the Limassol Recruit Training Centre (KEN Lemessos) temporarily. On 2 March, two further drones were intercepted near the island. British authorities decided to evacuate both the Akrotiri and Dhekelia bases as a result of the attacks, prompting the Cypriot government to instruct an evacuation of Akrotiri village itself. Following the attacks, the U.K. Government announced that British forces on the island would be reinforced, with additional fighter aircraft and Wildcat helicopters (equipped with anti-drone-capable Martlet missiles), in order to better protect British installations from attack. Additionally, the U.K. Royal Navy would deploy the air defence destroyer HMS Dragon to the region. The Hellenic Air Force deployed 4 F-16 Vipers to Cyprus to work with the Cypriot National Guard in maintaining air superiority over the island, with the Hellenic Navy deploying advanced FDI HN frigate Kimon and a MEKO-class frigate, Psara, to the Eastern Mediterranean.

Due to the Cypriot government and the public dissatisfaction with how the crisis was handled by the British, the President of Cyprus called for a "frank and open discussion" about the future of the British Bases. Though the UK initially rejected any negotiations regarding the change to the status quo of the bases, in October 2026, the first Structured Dialogue took place between the Republic of Cyprus and the United Kingdom regarding the operations of the bases, being confirmed by both the UK High Commission in Nicosia and the Cyprus Ministry of Foreign Affairs.

== Politics ==
=== Current status ===
The territory comprises two base areas. One is Akrotiri Cantonment (Greek: Ακρωτήρι pronounced [akroˈtiri]; Turkish: Ağrotur Turkish pronunciation: [ˈaːɾotuɾ]), or the Western Sovereign Base Area (WSBA), which includes two main bases at RAF Akrotiri and Episkopi Cantonment, plus all of Akrotiri village's district, including Limassol Salt Lake, and parts of eleven other village districts.

The other area is Dhekelia Cantonment (Greek: Δεκέλεια pronounced [ðeˈceʎa]; Turkish: Dikelya), or the Eastern Sovereign Base Area (ESBA), which includes a base at Ayios Nikolaos plus parts of twelve village districts.

As of 2026, based units include:

Akrotiri Cantonment (including RAF Akrotiri and Episkopi Cantonment):

- No. 903 Expeditionary Air Wing RAF
- No. 84 Squadron RAF
- 1st Battalion, Princess of Wales's Royal Regiment
- Cyprus Operations Support Unit
- Cyprus Military Working Dog Troop
- Cyprus Joint Police Unit (CJPU)

Dhekelia Cantonment

- 4th Battalion, Royal Regiment of Scotland
- Joint Service Adventure Training Centre

The Joint Service Signal Unit (Cyprus) is located at Ayios Nikolaos Station, in the ESBA. Ayios Nikolaus Station is an ELINT (electronic intelligence) listening installation of the UKUSA Agreement intelligence network. The UKUSA signals intelligence system is sometimes known as "ECHELON".

=== Governance ===
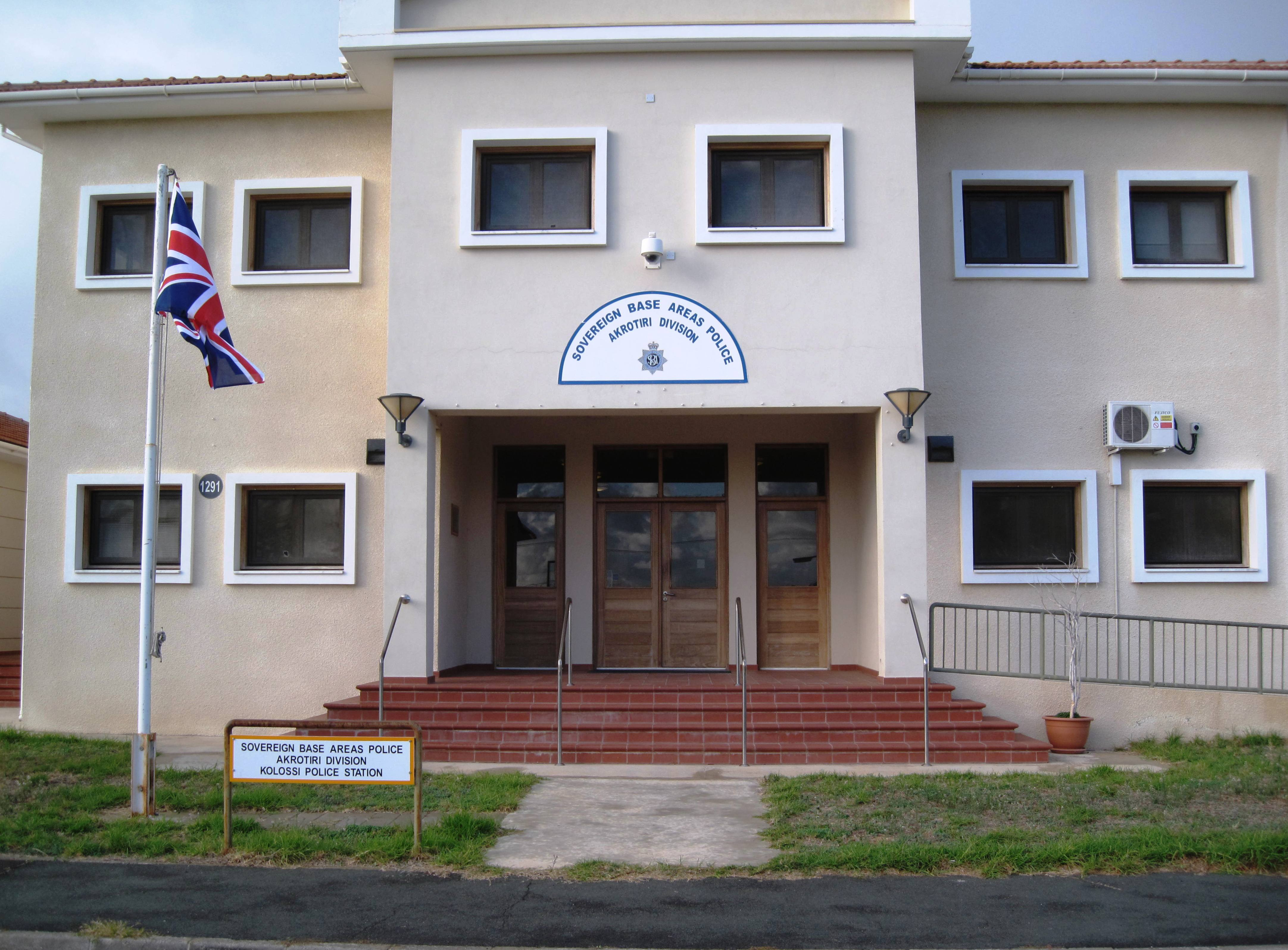
An SBA police station in Akrotiri

The sovereign bases were retained in 1960 to keep military bases in areas under British sovereignty, along with the rights retained to use other sites in what became the territory of the Republic. That makes them different from the other British Overseas Territories.

The basic philosophy of their administration was declared by the British government in Appendix O to the 1960 treaty with Cyprus, which provided that the British government intended:

- Not to develop the Sovereign Base Areas for other than military purposes.
- Not to set up and administer "colonies".
- Not to create customs posts or other frontier barriers between the Sovereign Base Areas and the Republic.
- Not to set up or permit the establishment of civilian commercial or industrial enterprises except insofar as these are connected with military requirements, and not otherwise to impair the economic, commercial or industrial unity and life of the Island.
- Not to establish commercial or civilian seaports or airports.
- Not to allow new settlement of people in the Sovereign Base Areas other than for temporary purposes.
- Not to expropriate private property within the Sovereign Base Areas except for military purposes on payment of fair compensation.

Appendix O also provides that various ancient monuments in the SBAs (in particular the site and remains of Kourion, the Sanctuary of Apollo Hylates near Kourion, the Stadium of Curium and the Church and remains of the Holy Monastery of St Nicholas of the Cats) should be administered by the Republic of Cyprus. The Cypriot government issues licences for antiquity excavation in the SBAs subject to British consent, and any movable antiquities found in excavations or otherwise discovered become Cypriot state property.

According to the British Ministry of Defence:

Because the SBAs are primarily required as military bases and not ordinary dependent territories, the Administration reports to the Ministry of Defence in London. It has no formal connection with the Foreign and Commonwealth Office or the British High Commission in Nicosia, although there are close informal links with both offices on policy matters.

The territory is administered by an Administrator, who is also the Commander of British Forces Cyprus, which as of March 2026 is Major General Tom Bewick. The Administrator is officially appointed by the British monarch on the advice of the Ministry of Defence. The Administrator has all the executive and legislative authority of a governor of an overseas territory.

A Chief Officer is appointed, and is responsible to the Administrator for the day-to-day running of the civil government, with subordinate Area Officers responsible for the civil administration of the two areas. No elections are held in the territory. British citizens are normally entitled to vote in United Kingdom elections, as British Forces or overseas electors.

The areas have their own legal system, distinct from the United Kingdom and the Republic of Cyprus. This consists of the laws of the Colony of Cyprus as of August 1960, amended as necessary. The laws of Akrotiri and Dhekelia are closely aligned with, and in some cases identical to, the laws operating within the Republic of Cyprus. The Court of the Sovereign Base Areas is concerned with non-military offences committed by any person within Akrotiri and Dhekelia.

Law and order is maintained by the Sovereign Base Areas Police. Offences involving British Forces Cyprus and military law are dealt with by the Cyprus Joint Police Unit. Fire and rescue services are provided by the Defence Fire and Risk Management Organisation through stations at Episkopi, Akrotiri, Dhekelia and Ayios Nikolayos. The Defence Medical Services provide emergency ambulance cover based from medical centres in the main bases. All emergency services are accessible from any telephone using the Europe-wide emergency number 112.

=== Reviews ===
In January 2010, a British press article claimed that as a result of budgetary constraints arising from the Great Recession, the British Ministry of Defence drew up controversial plans to withdraw the United Kingdom's 3,000-strong garrison and end the use of Cyprus as a staging point for ground forces. The Labour government, under whom the proposal appeared, was replaced by the Cameron–Clegg coalition whose defence review did not mention the issue.

On 15 December 2012, in a written statement to the House of Commons, the UK's Secretary of State for Defence, Philip Hammond, revealed the findings of a report on the SBA military bases following the completion of a review of their operations by Lord Ashcroft:

The Sovereign Base areas are in a region of geo-political importance and high priority for the United Kingdom's long term national security interests ... Our military personnel, United Kingdom civilians and locally employed personnel in the Sovereign Base Areas make a major contribution to the national security of the United Kingdom and will continue to do so in the future.

=== Dispute and controversies ===
The Republic of Cyprus claims that the Sovereign Base Areas are a "remnant of colonialism". On 30 June 2005 the House of Representatives of Cyprus unanimously adopted a resolution on the legal status of the base areas originally proposed by Vassos Lyssarides. The resolution refers to "relevant UN decisions on the abolition of colonialism, as well as the fundamental principles of international law, which forbid the occupation of territory within the domain of any other country." It claims that "the United Kingdom does not have substantial sovereignty over the British bases, but it has as much sovereignty as is necessary for military reasons and not for administrative, financial and / or any other reasons." The resolution urged the UK government "to fulfil its financial obligations towards the Republic of Cyprus, which derive from the Treaty of Establishment." It also argued that the UK does not have territorial waters in the areas.

The UK government does not recognise Cypriot claims that the UK's sovereignty in the areas is limited.

In July 2001, protests were held at the bases by local Cypriots, unhappy with British plans to construct radio masts at the bases as part of an upgrade of British military communication posts around the world. Locals claimed the masts would endanger local lives and cause cancer, as well as have a negative effect on wildlife in the area. The British and Cypriot governments jointly commissioned health research from the University of Bristol and the Ministry of Health of the Republic of Cyprus, and that research project reported in 2005 that there was no evidence of health problems being caused by electromagnetic fields from the antennas. The Sovereign Base Areas Administration has carried out assessments and surveys into the effects on wildlife, which have fed into an "Akrotiri Peninsula Environmental Management Plan", published in September 2012.

In 2004, the UK offered to cede 117 square kilometres (45 sq mi) of farmland as part of the rejected Annan Plan for Cyprus.

On 29 August 2013, during the Syrian civil war, some Cypriot and British media sources speculated that long-range ballistic missiles, fired from Syria in retaliation for proposed British involvement in military intervention against the Syrian government of Bashar al-Assad, could hit Cyprus, and could potentially deliver chemical weapons. In some Cypriot media it was stated that the proposed interdiction of the Syrian civil war, utilising Akrotiri and Dhekelia, could recklessly endanger the Cypriot populations near to those bases. Two days earlier, on 27 August 2013, Cypriot foreign minister Ioannis Kasoulides had moved to calm Cypriot concerns, saying that the British bases were unlikely to play a major part in any intervention.

A spike in the US Air Force arms delivery from US and NATO depots in Europe to Akrotiri was reported by the Israeli newspaper Haaretz, and "the illegal presence of thousands of American soldiers" at the base have drawn criticism. During his 2024 visit to the base dispatching surveillance planes to Gaza, the British prime minister Keir Starmer noted, "We can't necessarily tell the world what you're doing here" "for reasons that are obvious to you, the whole world is relying on you". Surveillance planes continued being dispatched towards Gaza after the ceasefire between Israel and Hamas began.

In March 2026, during the 2026 Iran war, a drone strike was launched against the bases by Hezbollah. Following the attack, the diplomatic tension raised higher between Britain and Cyprus, as domestic protests criticized the presence of the bases and being dragged into regional conflict. In April 2026, British Minister for the Armed Forces Al Carns made it clear that there will be no negotiation about the bases or ceding sovereignty over the bases.

=== Border and travel documents ===
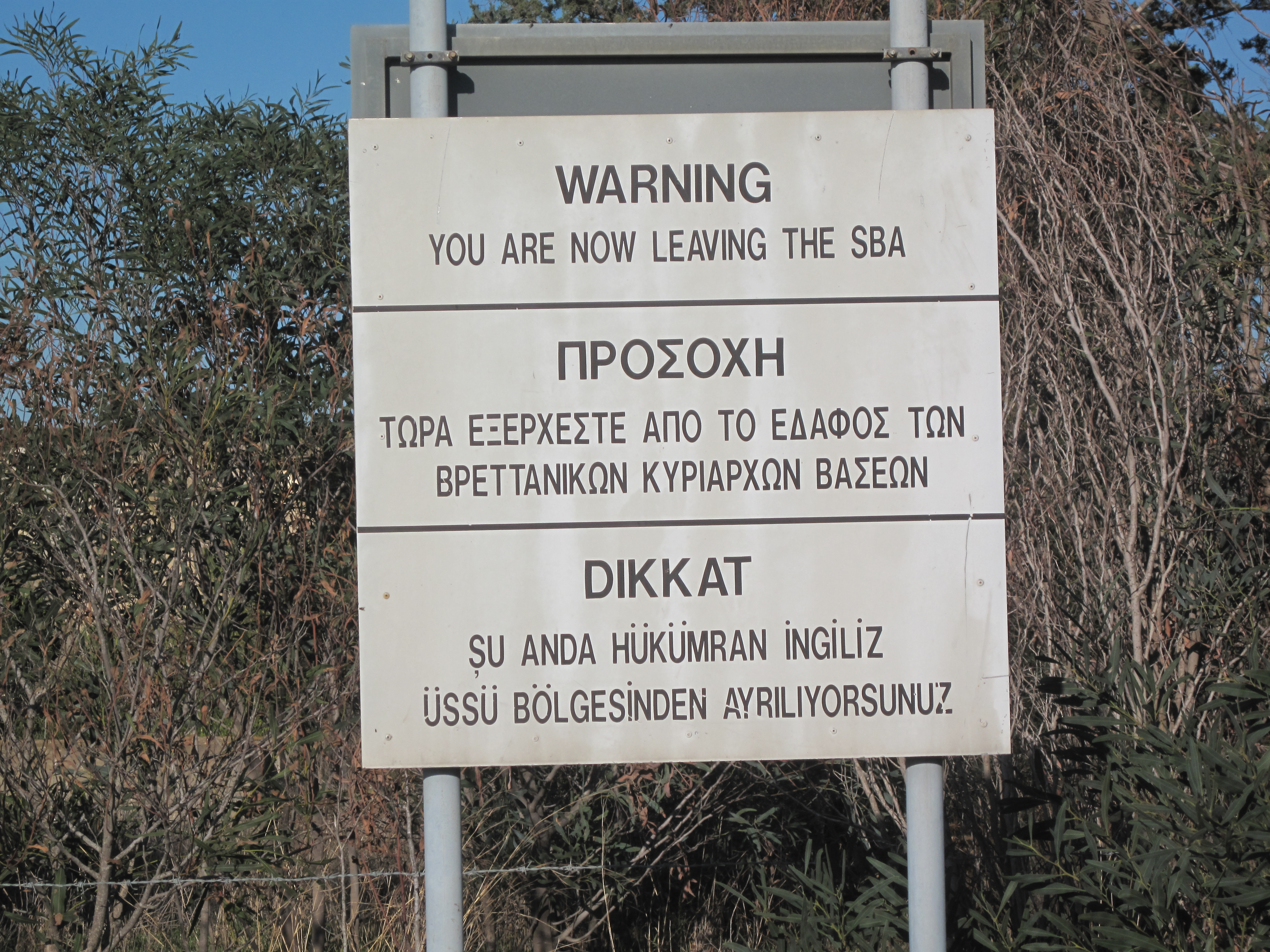
A warning sign in English, Greek and Turkish at the border of Dhekelia

There is normally no passport check at the border from Akrotiri or Dhekelia to Cyprus. Perhaps to help reduce any tensions in the area, outside of the bases much of the territory is indistinguishable from that controlled by Cyprus and casual visitors may not realise that they have crossed an international border. In the exchange of notes establishing them, the British government specifically stated that it would not "...create customs posts or other frontier barriers between the Sovereign Base Areas and the Republic."

The main road connecting all major cities on Cyprus's southern shore run non-stop through SBA: Some 7 km (5 miles) of the A6 highway through Akrotiri SBA and some 16 km (10 miles) of the A3 highway through Dhekelia SBA. More formal controls do exist at the Turkish Republic of Northern Cyprus boundary.

Possession of a passport or an EU-compliant national identity card is generally needed in Cyprus. A passport is required to travel between Cyprus/SBAs and Northern Cyprus. Issues concerning the validity of car insurance and customs are specified by SBAs' administration.

=== Brexit implications ===
Under Article 2(1) of the Protocol, the SBAs were partially part of the European Union Customs Union in three domains: VAT, agriculture and fisheries. However, the SBAs were already outside the EU. Therefore, concerns were raised about the future status of about 15,000 Cypriots (EU citizens) working in the SBA following the UK's 2020 departure from the EU. Cyprus, Ireland and Spain were the only three EU states that conducted bilateral talks with the UK on the Brexit issue. The talks between the UK and the Republic of Cyprus started in October 2017.

The Brexit withdrawal agreement has a protocol on the SBAs, with provisions maintaining their previous status.

== Geography ==
A map of Akrotiri, Western Sovereign Base Area, BFPO 57

A map of Dhekelia, Eastern Sovereign Base Area, BFPOs 58 & 59

Akrotiri and Dhekelia cover 3% of the land area of Cyprus, a total of 254 km^{2} (98 sq mi) (split 123 km^{2} (47 sq mi) (48.5%) at Akrotiri and 131 km^{2} (51 sq mi) (51.5%) at Dhekelia). Akrotiri and Dhekelia have a border of 48 km (30 mi) and 108 km (67 mi) with Cyprus respectively. Akrotiri also has a longer coastline than Dhekelia. 60% of the land is privately owned as freeholds by Cypriot citizens; the other 40% is controlled by the Ministry of Defence as Crown leasehold land.

In January 2014, an agreement between the Cypriot and UK governments was signed, ensuring that residents and property owners in the British Bases will enjoy equal rights for the development of property. In addition to Akrotiri and Dhekelia, the Treaty of Establishment also provided for the continued use by the British Ministry of Defence and the British Armed Forces of certain facilities within the Republic of Cyprus, known as Retained Sites.

Akrotiri is located in the south of the island, near the city of Limassol (or Lemesos). Dhekelia is in the southeast, near Larnaca. Both areas include military bases, as well as farmland and some residential land. Akrotiri is surrounded by territory controlled by the Republic of Cyprus, but Dhekelia also borders on the United Nations (UN) buffer zone and the area controlled by the Turkish forces.

Ayia Napa lies to the east of Dhekelia. The villages of Xylotympou and Ormideia, also in the Republic of Cyprus, are enclaves surrounded by Dhekelia. The Dhekelia Power Station, divided by a British road into two parts, also belongs to the Republic of Cyprus. The northern part is an enclave, like the two villages, whereas the southern part is located by the sea, and therefore not an enclave, though it has no territorial waters of its own.

Territorial waters of 3 nautical miles (5.6 km) are claimed, and the right according to the laws of the UN to extend the claim of up to 12 nautical miles (22.2 km) is reserved.

=== Wildlife and ecology ===
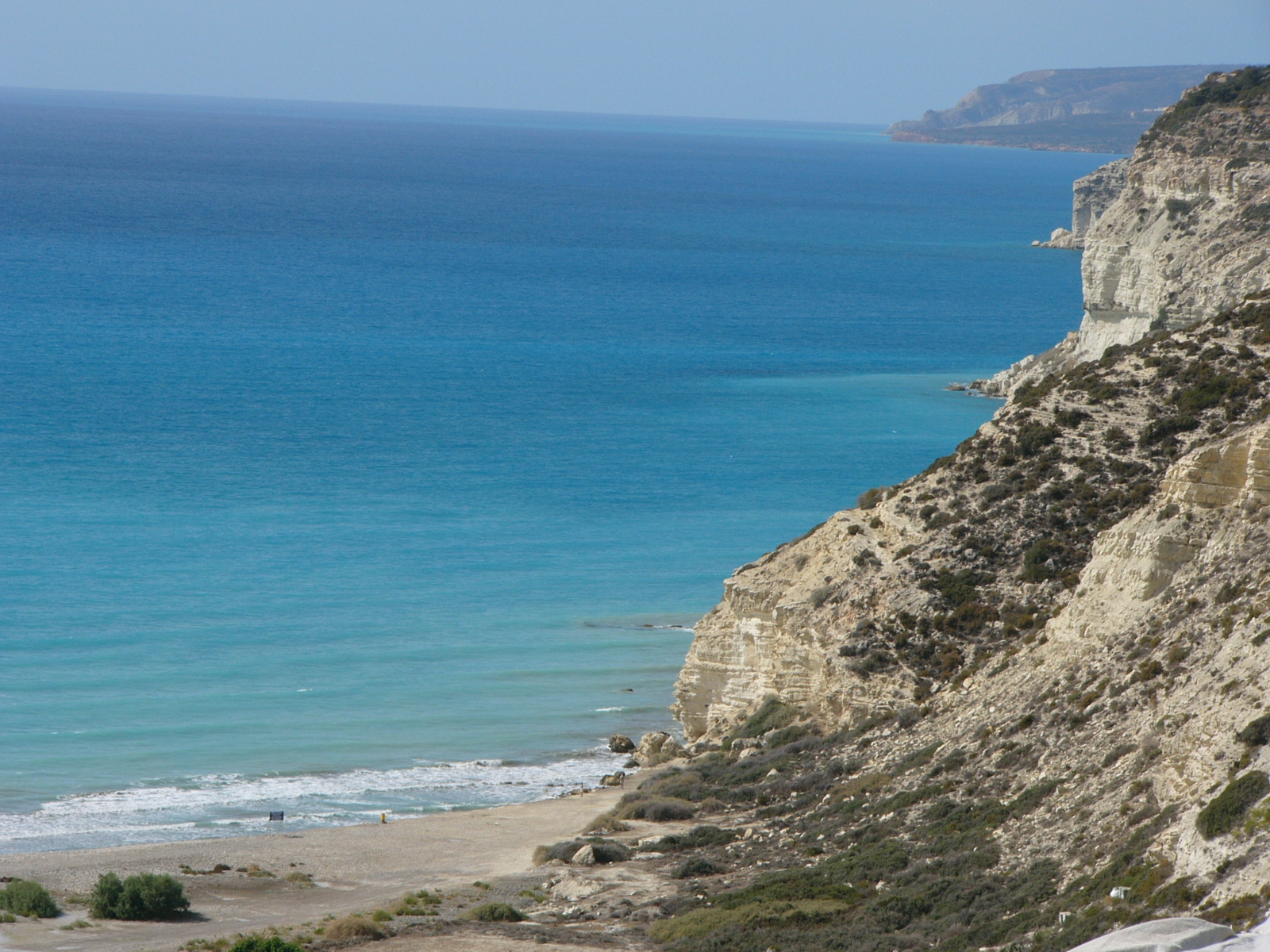
Episkopi Bay on the west coast of Akrotiri

Cyprus is an important migration flyway for birds between Africa and Europe and millions of birds are killed yearly as they migrate over the island. To protect resident and migratory birds, BirdLife Cyprus and the RSPB survey areas of illegal trapping. More than 150 species of birds, over half of conservation concern, have been trapped in nets, or on limesticks, and it is estimated that organised crime gangs earn over 15 million euros yearly. The dead birds are sold to provide the main ingredient for ambelopoulia — an illegal delicacy — in the Republic of Cyprus. The 2015 survey estimated a maximum 19 km (12 mi) of mist nets across both the Republic and the British Territories, and more than 5,300 limesticks removed, mainly in the Republic. It is estimated that over 2 million birds were killed in 2015 including over 800,000 on British Territories.

Employing measures such as covert camera surveillance, including a drone, exclusion zones and impounding vehicles, trapping activity at Dhekelia fell by 77.5%. In 2016, an estimated 800,000 birds were killed at Dhekelia. In 2017, trapping activity fell by 77.5% and bird deaths to an estimated 180,000.

The Episkopi Cliffs Important Bird Area lies mostly within the western base area, and covers much of the peninsula. It was identified as an IBA in 1989, and became recognised under the Ramsar Convention in 2003. 60% was designated as a Special Protection Area in 2010. Over 300 bird species have been recorded in this area. The wetlands, including the large salt lake, are an important habitat and bird hotspot. These wetlands are an important breeding spot for the ferruginous duck, which has nested there since 2005. Other species that nest in the wetlands include the black-winged stilt, the Kentish plover, the spur-winged lapwing, and the stone-curlew. Black francolins, Cyprus wheatears, Cyprus warblers, Eleonora's falcons, peregrine falcons, griffon vultures, European shags, European rollers, blue rock thrushs, and wallcreepers breed elsewhere in the area, especially around the cliffs.

The beaches in the British Sovereign Base Areas (SBAs) are important nesting sites for the endangered green Chelonia mydas and loggerhead Caretta caretta turtles. The SBA Environment Department, assisted by a large volunteer effort, has monitored turtle nesting success on SBA beaches since 1990. Disturbance to nesting turtles is an issue in some areas due to activities such as camping, driving on beaches and illegal fishing. Sea turtles in Cyprus are protected as priority species under the Protection and Management of Nature and Wildlife Ordinance (implementing the provisions of the Habitats Directive), enacted in 2007.

In December 2015, five Special Areas of Conservation (SACs) were designated in the Cyprus Sovereign Base Areas. The five SACs designated are Akrotiri, Episkopi, Cape Pyla, Dhekelia and Agios Nikolaos. The designations were made under the Protection and Management of Nature and Wildlife Ordinance and will support the existing network (NATURA 2000) of SACs in Cyprus and across Europe.

== Demographics ==
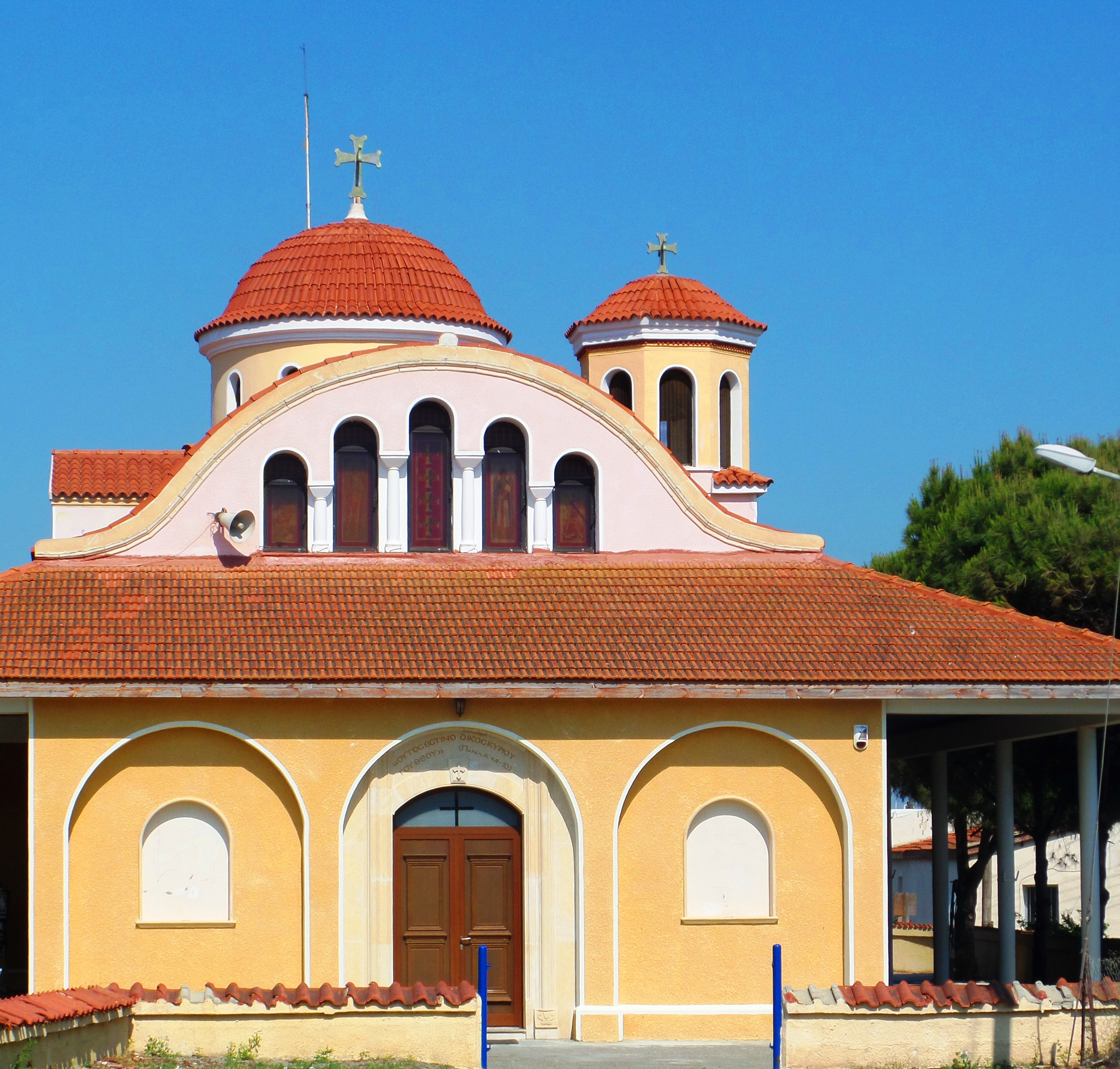
Holy Cross Church in Akrotiri village

When the areas were being established, the boundaries were deliberately drawn to avoid centres of population. Approximately 18,195 people live in the areas. About 11,000 native Cypriots work in the areas, or on farmland within the boundaries of the areas. The British military and their families make up the rest of the population.

Persons related to the territory may in theory be eligible to claim the British Overseas Territories citizenship (BOTC status) through a personal connection to the areas, i.e., birth on the territory before 1983, or born after 1983 to a parent who was born on the territory before 1983. Unlike most other British Overseas Territories, there is no provision in the 2002 amendment of the British Nationality Act 1981 by which British citizenship, with the right of abode in the United Kingdom, can be claimed through automatic entitlement, or be applied for by means of registration, from or through a sole personal connection to the Base Areas.

In comparison, the 2002 Act bestowed British citizenship on all other BOTCs. Hence, non-British and non-military personnel with a connection to the territory cannot live and work in the UK, and must use their Cypriot passports to apply for visas to the UK.

Under the terms of the 1960 agreement with Cyprus establishing the Sovereign Base Areas, the United Kingdom is committed not to use the areas for civilian purposes. This was stated in 2002 as the primary reason for the exclusion of the areas from the scope of the British Overseas Territories Act 2002. As of 2010, around 7,195 service personnel of British Forces Cyprus are based at Akrotiri and Dhekelia.

=== Education ===
Service Children's Education oversees education for children of personnel and MoD employees. The Eastern Sovereign Base Area is served by Dhekelia Primary School and Ayios Nikolaos Primary School, which are feeders for King Richard School. The Western Sovereign Base Area is served by Episkopi Primary School and Akrotiri Primary School, which are feeders for St. John's School.

== Economy ==
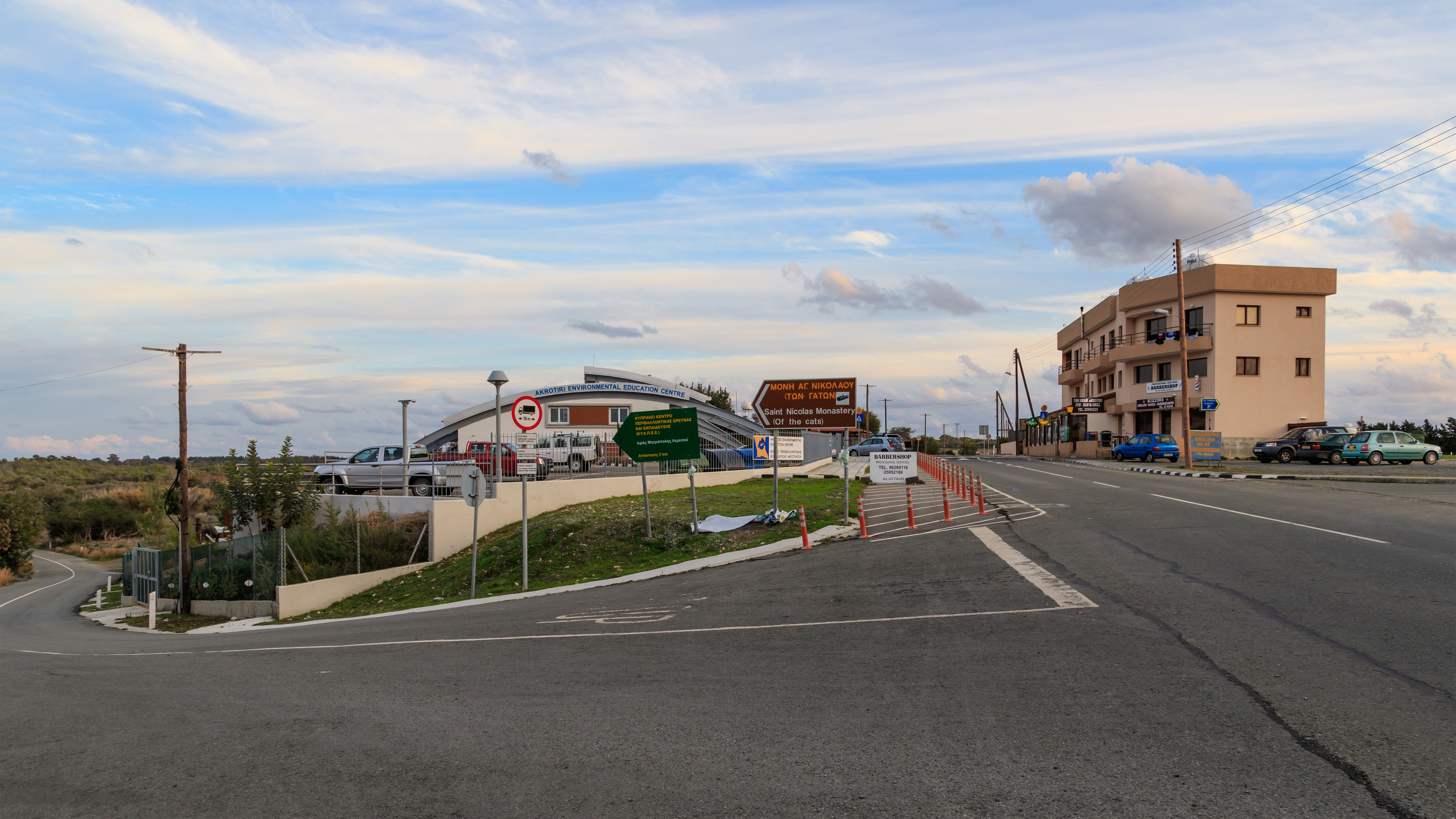
Akrotiri village

No economic statistics are gathered for Akrotiri and Dhekelia. The main economic activities are the provision of services to the military, as well as limited agriculture. When the territory under the effective control of the Republic of Cyprus switched currencies from the Cypriot pound to the euro in January 2008, Akrotiri and Dhekelia followed suit, making the Sovereign Base Areas the only territory under British sovereignty to officially use the euro.

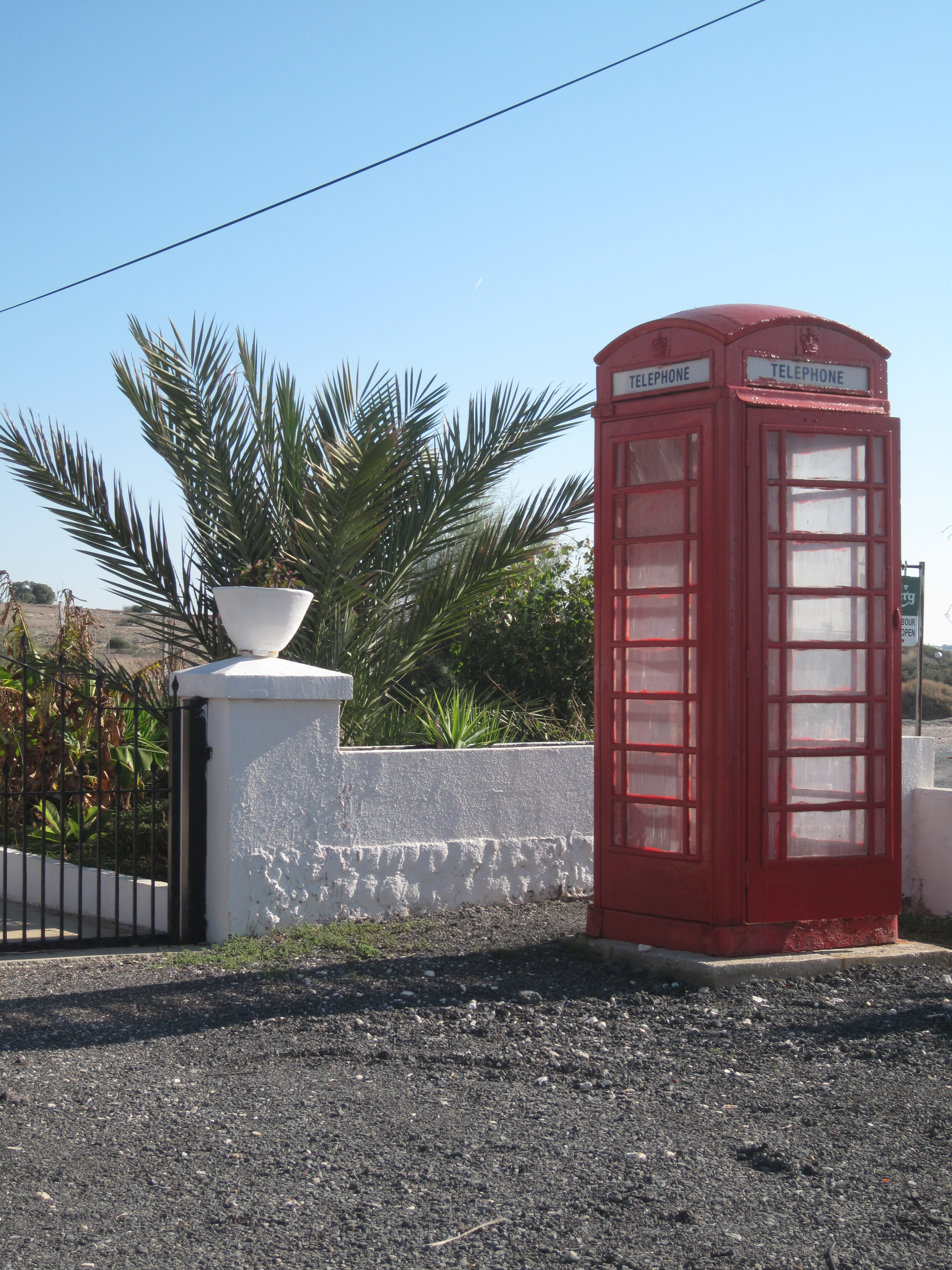
A British red telephone box in Dhekelia

=== Transport ===
Cypriot motorways pass through both areas, the most prominent case being the A3 motorway which runs for approximately 16km (10 miles) within the Dhekelia area. There is no public airport within the areas, but the RAF Akrotiri airbase is located there, which has a runway suitable for long-distance flights, but is not used for public flights.

The closest civilian international airport to the Akrotiri area is Paphos International Airport 40km (25 miles) away, while the closest to the Dhekelia area is Larnaka International Airport 15km (10 miles) away. As with the rest of Cyprus, there is no rail transport within the two areas.

=== Communications ===
The Base Areas form part of the Republic of Cyprus telephone numbering plan, using the international prefix +357. Landline numbers are in the same eight-digit format, with the last four digits being the line number. Numbers in Dhekelia begin with the digits 2474. Those in Akrotiri begin with the digits 2527.

Postal services are provided by the British Forces Post Office, with mail to Akrotiri being addressed to BFPO 57 mail to Dhekelia being addressed to BFPO 58 and Ayios Nikolaos being addressed to BFPO 59 Cyprus Postal Services provides postal service for civilian homes and businesses within the Base Areas, then using Cypriot postal codes and "Cyprus" as country on letters from abroad.

The bases are issued different amateur radio call signs from the Republic of Cyprus. Amateur radio stations on the bases use the International Telecommunication Union prefix of "ZC4", which is assigned to Great Britain. There are about 52 amateurs licensed in this manner. Amateur radio direction finding identified RAF Akrotiri as the location of the powerful but now defunct shortwave numbers station "Lincolnshire Poacher". Several curtain antennas there have been identified as being used for these transmissions.

== Culture ==
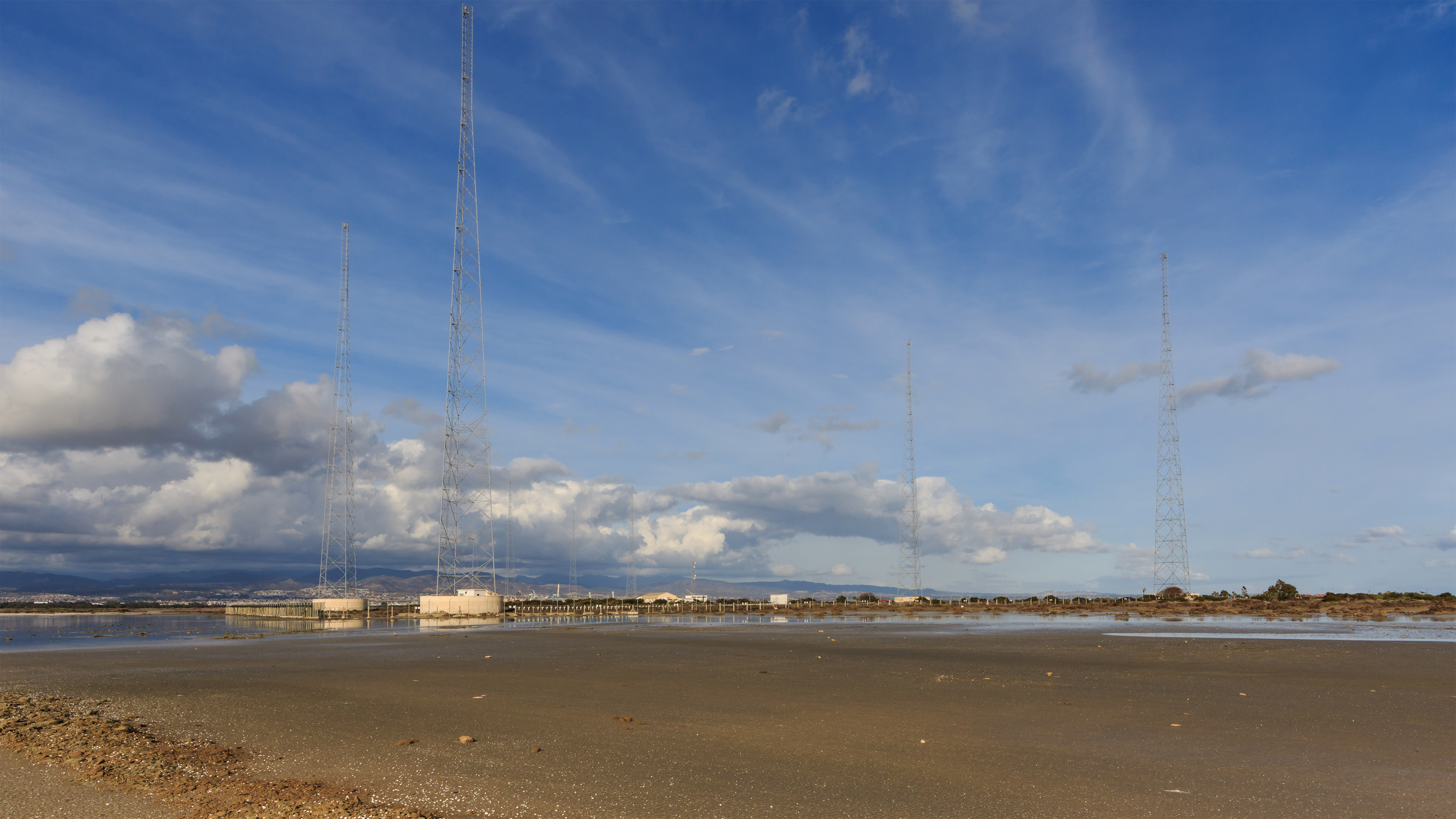
BBC World Service transmitter masts in Akrotiri

=== Media ===
BFBS Radio 1 and 2 are broadcast on FM and can be widely received across Cyprus. BFBS Television is now only available to viewers via satellite, having been confined to the SBAs or encrypted in 1997 for copyright reasons, before BFBS switched off its analogue transmitters in 2009. The British East Mediterranean Relay Station was situated locally.

=== Sport ===
The most successful association football team in the territory is Ethnikos Achna FC in the Dhekelia region. They play in the Cypriot football league system and have played in the top tier Cypriot First Division for most of their existence. They represented Cyprus in the 2006–07 UEFA Cup, losing to RC Lens from France in Round 1. Their stadium, Dasaki Stadium, hosted six matches in the 2024 UEFA European Under-17 Championship.

Other teams in the territory also play in the Cypriot league system, for instance APEA Akrotiri. A separate league for British military teams, the Cyprus Forces Football League, is run by the Royal Air Force FA.

The Commander British Forces Cyprus Sporting Competition (CBF Cup), a multi-sport competition between teams representing bases and resident British infantry battalions, is held annually.

The territory does not send delegations to the Commonwealth Games, and has not sent athletes to the Olympic Games through the British Olympic Association.

Akrotiri Parkrun, a 5K run, takes place every Saturday morning. It is not open to the general public.

== See also ==
- Index of Akrotiri and Dhekelia-related articles
- List of British Army installations
- List of British overseas territories
- Killing of Louise Jensen
- Sovereign Base Areas Customs
- Treaty Ports (Ireland)
- United Nations Buffer Zone in Cyprus
- Overseas military bases of the United Kingdom
