= Episkopi Cantonment =

Capital of Akrotiri and Dhekelia - military base of British Overseas Territory

Episkopi Cantonment Φρουρά Επισκοπής (Greek) Episkopi Kantonu (Turkish)
- Capital city
- Episkopi Cantonment in the Eastern Sovereign Base Area
- Etymology: The word 'Episkopi' comes from the Greek word Επισκοπικός meaning "Episcopal."
- Interactive map of Episkopi Cantonment
- Location within Cyprus Location within the Mediterranean Location within Europe
- Coordinates: 34.676°N 32.8375°E
- Territory: Akrotiri and Dhekelia
- Overseas territory: British Overseas Territory
- Base Area: Western Sovereign Base Area (Akrotiri)

Episkopi Cantonment (Greek: Φρουρά Επισκοπής; Turkish: Episkopi Kantonu) is the capital of Akrotiri and Dhekelia, a British overseas territory on the island of Cyprus, administered as a military base. It is located in the northwestern part of the Western Sovereign Base Area (Akrotiri), one of the two areas which comprise the territory. Although it is not the largest of the British military bases on the island, it is home to both the civilian and military administration headquarters of the Sovereign Base Areas. Episkopi is the current command centre of British Forces Cyprus.

== Etymology ==
The word 'Episkopi' means "bishop's seat" in Greek. The cantonment was named so due to the site previously serving as the bishop's seat of an Orthodox diocese.

== Transportation ==
Paved motorways and other smaller roads connect the cantonment area with the rest of Akrotiri and Dhekelia.

== See also ==
- British Forces Cyprus
- Dhekelia Cantonment
- Episkopi, Limassol
- Royal Military Police
- Sovereign Base Areas
- Sovereign Base Areas Customs
- Sovereign Base Areas Police
- St. John's School
