= Sovereign Base Areas Police =

Civilian police force of the Sovereign Base Areas

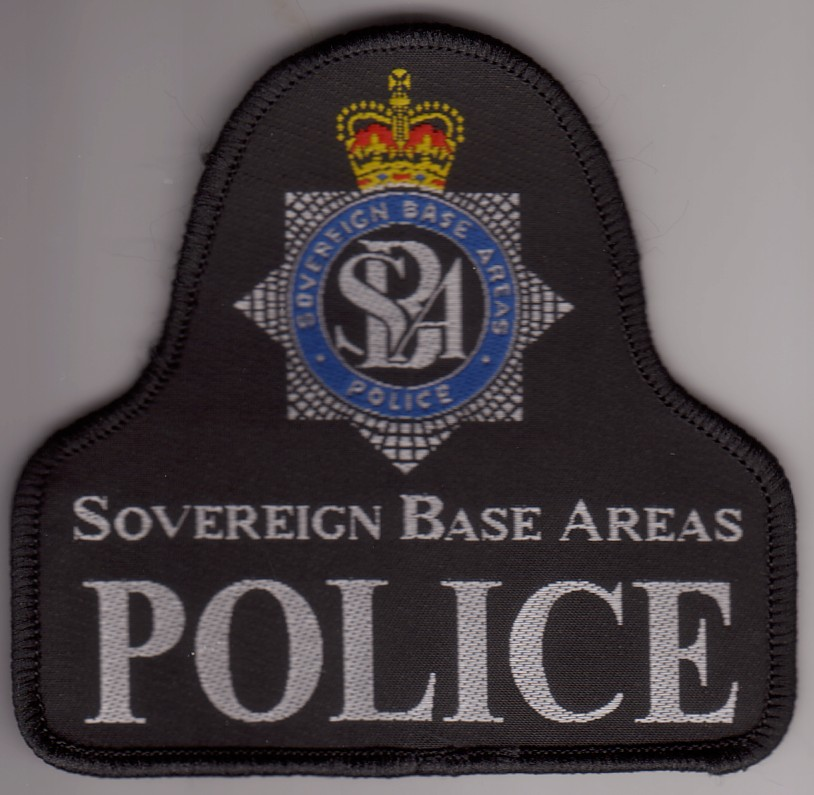
- SBA Police patch with badge

- Common name: Sovereign Base Areas Police

Agency overview
- Formed: 15 August 1960
- Employees: 253

Jurisdictional structure
- National agency (Operations jurisdiction): SBA
- Operations jurisdiction: SBA
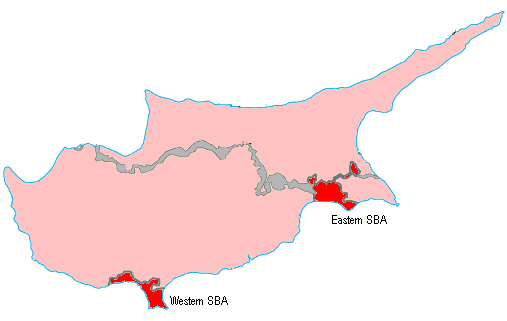
- Map of the Sovereign Base Areas Police's jurisdiction.
- Area: 250 km^{2}
- Population: 14,000
- Legal jurisdiction: As per operations jurisdiction
- Governing body: Ministry of Defence (United Kingdom)
- General nature: Civilian police

Operational structure
- Headquarters: Sovereign Base Areas Police HQ, British Forces Episkopi
- Military appointment responsible: Air Vice Marshal Peter J.M. Squires OBE MA BEng (Hons), Administrator, Sovereign Base Areas
- Agency executive: Mick Matthews, Chief Constable
- Parent agency: Ministry of Defence

Facilities
- Stations: 3: Episkopi Police Station; Dhekelia Police Station; Ay Nicolaos Police Station
- Prisons: His Majesty's Prison, Dhekelia
- Patrol cars: Yes
- Armed response vehicles: Yes
- Dogs: Yes

Website
- www.sba.mod.uk/web_pages/sbap.htm

The Sovereign Base Areas Police is the local civilian police force for the British controlled Sovereign Base Areas (SBA) of Akrotiri and Dhekelia in Cyprus. They were established in 1960 and have jurisdiction within the SBAs.

== Organisation ==
The Sovereign Base Areas Police was established in August 1960 under the Treaty of Establishment, taking over from the colonial Cyprus Police of British Cyprus. The force has responsibility for all 15,000 residents of the SBAs, including military personnel. The Cyprus Joint Police Unit (the Royal Navy Police, Royal Military Police and RAF Police), has concurrent jurisdiction over all offences committed by service personnel and UK dependents/employees within the SBAs, garrisons, and stations, and other retained military sites outside the SBAs. Both work in full cooperation with each other and any jurisdiction issues are managed through an agreed memorandum of understanding. The SBA Police have jurisdiction over all crimes committed within the SBAs. The Republic of Cyprus is able to make removal requests to move those arrested in the SBAs into Cypriot court jurisdiction. However the SBA Police have the sovereign right to decline if there is insufficient evidence that any crimes occurred outside the SBAs.

=== Numbers ===
The SBA Police consists of a total of 241 officers and 12 civilian employees. There are British senior officers, with the remainder recruited from the Greek Cypriot and Turkish Cypriot communities. In addition to its regular policing duties, the SBA Police has responsibility for the operation of HMP Dhekelia (the SBA Prison).

== Affiliation ==
Although the SBA Police is administered by the Ministry of Defence, it is a separate force from the Ministry of Defence Police (MDP).

== See also ==
- Sovereign Base Areas Customs
- Cyprus Police
- Gibraltar Defence Police
