= Akrotiri =

Akrotiri (Greek: Ακρωτήρι, pronounced Greek: [akroˈtiri]) means "cape, promontory". As a result, many different seaside places bear this name. Akrotiri may refer to:

== Places ==
=== Cyprus ===
- Akrotiri and Dhekelia, a British Overseas Territory
- Akrotiri (village), a village in the Akrotiri Peninsula
- Akrotiri Bay, a bay in the south
- Akrotiri Cantonment, a military base in Akrotiri and Dhekelia
- Akrotiri Peninsula (Cyprus), a peninsula bounded by Akrotiri Bay and Episkopi Bay
- RAF Akrotiri, a British Royal Air Force base

=== Greece ===
- Akrotiri, Crete, a peninsula and a municipality on the island of Crete
- Akrotiri (prehistoric city), a Minoan settlement on the island of Santorini (Thera)
- Akrotiri, Santorini, a modern village near the Minoan settlement above
- Castle of Akrotiri, a former Venetian castle in the Santorini village above

== See also ==
- Akrotiri Salt Lake, a popular wintering place for flamingos in the Akrotiri Peninsula in Cyprus
- Akrotiri Boxer Fresco, a Bronze Age painting in the Greek prehistoric city above
- Eğirdir, a town in Isparta Province in Turkey
