= Xerocrassa carinatoglobosa =

Conservation status
- Endangered (IUCN 3.1)

Scientific classification
- Kingdom: Animalia
- Phylum: Mollusca
- Class: Gastropoda
- Order: Stylommatophora
- Family: Geomitridae
- Genus: Xerocrassa
- Species: X. carinatoglobosa

Binomial name
- Xerocrassa carinatoglobosa (Haas, 1934)
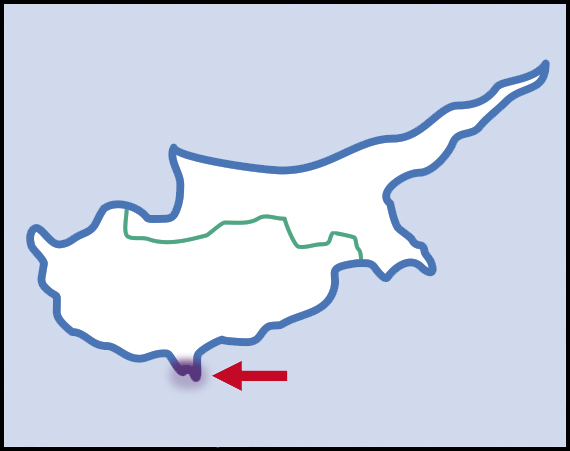

Synonyms
- Helicella syrensis carinatoglobosa Haas, 1934 (basionym); Trochoidea carinatoglobosa (F. Haas, 1934) · alternate representation

Species of gastropod

Xerocrassa carinatoglobosa is a species of air-breathing land snail, a terrestrial pulmonate gastropod mollusc in the family Geomitridae. It was formerly placed in the genus Trochoidea. Xerocrassa carinatoglobosa adults measure 5–9 mm tall and 9–13 mm wide. The shell can be keeled or regularly rounded and is predominantly white with a wide brown band on the upper side and several more, sometimes narrower bands on the lower side. It is endemic to the Akrotiri peninsula in Cyprus. The snail was formerly listed as being data deficient on the IUCN Red List due to the paucity of information about the species' taxonomic status and ecology.

== Taxonomy ==
Xerocrassa carinatoglobosa was described as a new subspecies, Helicella (Jacosta) syrensis carinato-globosa, by the German zoologist Fritz Haas in 1934. It was subsequently promoted to full species status, but had a disputed generic placement. It was formerly also placed in the genus Trochoidea.

== Description ==
Xerocrassa carinatoglobosa adults measure 5–9 mm tall and 9–13 mm wide. The shell can be keeled or regularly rounded and is predominantly white with a wide brown band on the upper side and several more, sometimes narrower bands on the lower side. The shell is solid and somewhat translucent, with coarse striations. There are 4.5 to 5.5 weakly convex whorls. In some individuals, the suture can be scalarid. The keel is less pronounced on the final whorl and can vanish near the aperture. The inner edge of the aperture has a faint white lip. The umbilicus is open and measures 1/9 to 1/6 of the shell diameter.

== Distribution ==
X. carinatoglobosa is endemic to Cyprus, where it is known from three locations in the Akrotiri peninsula: Akrotiri forest, Cape Gata, and Cape Zevgari. It inhabits open and forested habitats.

== Conservation ==
The snail is listed as being an Endangered species on the IUCN Red List. It is threatened by urbanisation and an airport in its range. Grazing and fire are potential threats to the species.
