= Dreamer's Bay =

Archaeological site in Cyprus

- Nissarouin (Αρχαίο λιμάνι στο Νησσαρούιν; Greek: Ancient port in Nisaruin)
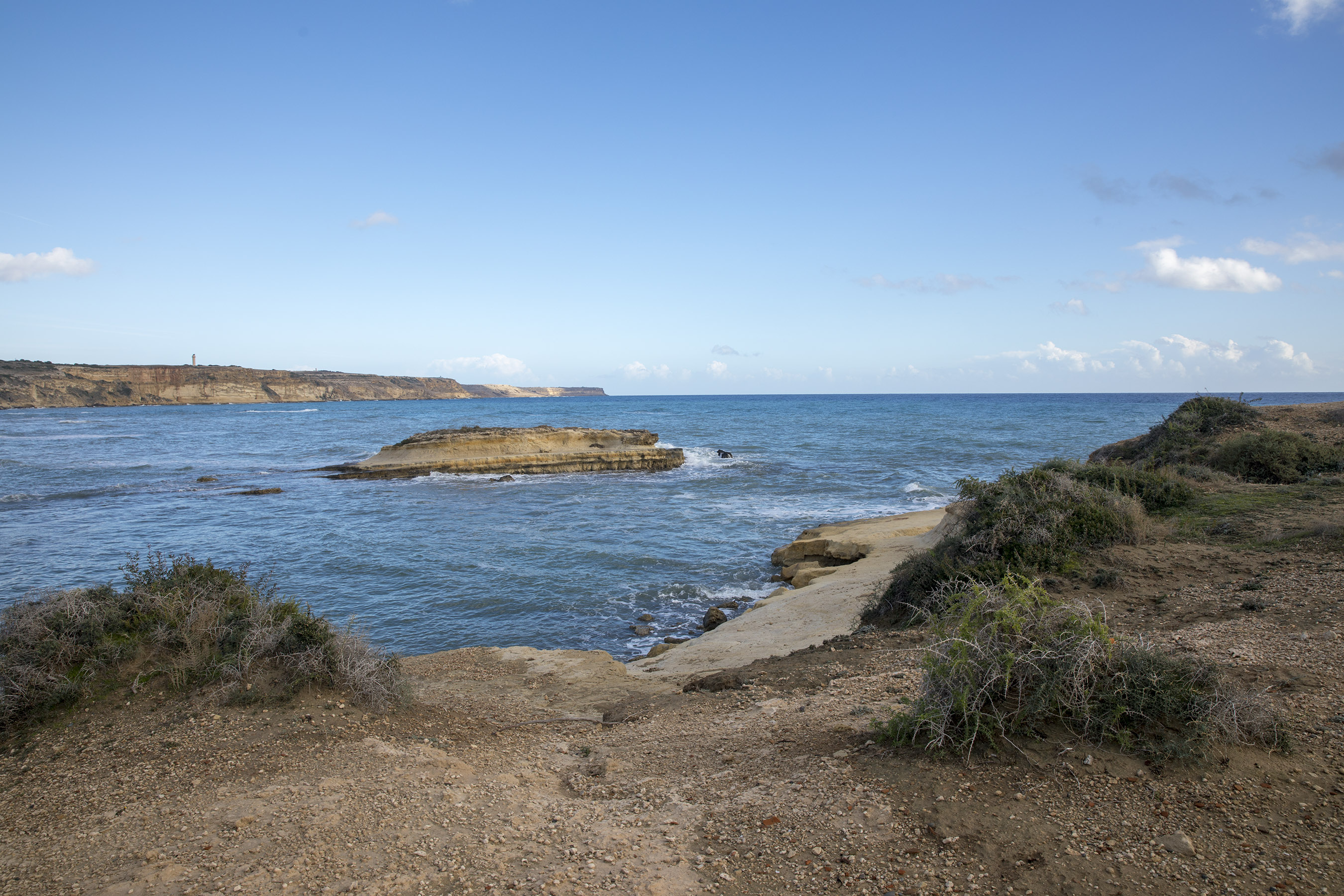
- Dreamer's Bay looking east

- Location in Cyprus
- 34.5687°N 32.9659°E
- Type: Port
- Periods: Roman; Byzantine; Hellenistic (possible)
- Location: Akrotiri Peninsula, Cyprus

Site notes
- Elevation: 5 m (16 ft)
- Excavation dates: 2015–2019
- Archaeologists: Simon James; Vicki Score
- Owner: Private
- Management: Ministry of Defence (MoD); Sovereign Base Area (SBA)
- Public access: Limited

Dreamer's Bay (Greek: Αρχαίο λιμάνι στο Νησσαρούιν) is an ancient port complex located on the southern tip of the Akrotiri Peninsula on Cyprus. The remains have been dated to the Roman or Byzantine period in history and included the port, associated warehouses, quarries and a ship repair yard. The site was believed to have been in existence from the 5th to 6th centuries AD. The site was most likely a waypoint for resupply for ships transiting around the Mediterranean Sea between Greece, Egypt, Syria and Asia Minor.

The location is inside RAF Akrotiri, part of the Sovereign Base Area on Akrotiri Peninsula and under the control of the British military and as such is not open to the general public. Several archaeological investigations have been undertaken on the site, and also in the water surrounding the port, which have uncovered stone columns resting on the seabed. The abandonment of the port most likely occurred after a natural disaster such as an earthquake or tsunami.

The site is often labelled as "one of the best-preserved ancient ports in the Mediterranean".

== History ==
Heavy rains along the peninsula during 1973 and 1974 revealed some masonry in the area around Dreamer's Bay. This prompted minor archaeological investigation through the 1980s, but the largest digs have been from 2015, with five major investigations each year up until 2019, the most recent one. The port is thought to have existed between 100 and 600 AD (Roman/Byzantium times), though it could have existed since the 3rd century BC (Hellenistic). The port had a submerged artificial breakwater and was believed to have served as a maritime link of the city of Kourion, some 13 kilometres (8 mi) to the north west. There are some advanced geographical theories that the Akrotiri Peninsula was actually an island and the city of Kourion was much nearer the sea. The peninsula silted up at both sides and prompted the building of a new harbour at Dreamer's Bay. This would have made the port at Dreamer's Bay a valuable waypoint between the ancient countries of Greece, Egypt and Asia Minor, as well as affording supplies in and out of Cyprus.

The port complex is thought to have consisted of several masonry style buildings used as warehouses with associated chandlery and adjacent quarries. No domestic accommodation is believed to have existed there as none of the early digs had revealed any evidence of such a structure, but later evidence suggested a small amount of burning and debris from pots, which could be indicative of domestic activity.

One of the theories about why the port was abandoned is the possibility of a tsunami like event which wrecked the port and destroyed ships in the port. Stone columns found lying on the seabed are believed to have been on their way from Egypt to Antioch. Finds of coins and roofing materials suggest the site was in use until at least the 6th century AD. Fragments of pottery have been dated to the 4th century with their destruction possibly being in an earthquake in 360 AD which wrought devastation upon nearby Kourion.

Successive marine investigations have also uncovered a shipwreck just south of the port area that covers an area of 130,000 square metres (1,400,000 sq ft).

Other archaeological remains have been discovered further inland, including one with a possible spiral staircase, which could have been a tower. Whilst these buildings were not at the highest elevation on the peninsula, they would have afforded the best view from both capes at the southern end of Akrotiri.

Items that have been uncovered and are able to be transported away from the site have been put into storage for possible display in a future museum on the island.

== Location ==
The site is located near to Aetokremnos, (Greek: Cliff of the Eagles) in the Limassol District on the southern tip of Cyprus, known as the Akrotiri Peninsula. The existence of humans has been dated to around 12,500 BP with animal bones radiocarbon dated to that period. The 10-kilometre (6 mi) coastline along the southern edge of Akrotiri is largely cliffs and the site at Dreamer's Bay would have been the only suitable location for a port.

As the site is on a military base away from the main operating and domestic areas, it has a very restricted access and is largely free of human interference. As such, the find is quite rare and has led to the site being recognised as being "one of the best-preserved ancient ports in the Mediterranean". The location of the site affords a good view of Cape Zevgari to the west and Cape Gata to the east; so this would provide ample warning of approaching shipping and serve as a landmark for vessels wishing to call in at the port.

The British military have acknowledged that the archaeological remains are part of the Cypriot culture and heritage, but their care and administration is the responsibility of the Sovereign Base Area.
