= Operation Highbrow =

United Kingdom 2006 military led evacuee operation

- Part of 2006 Lebanon War
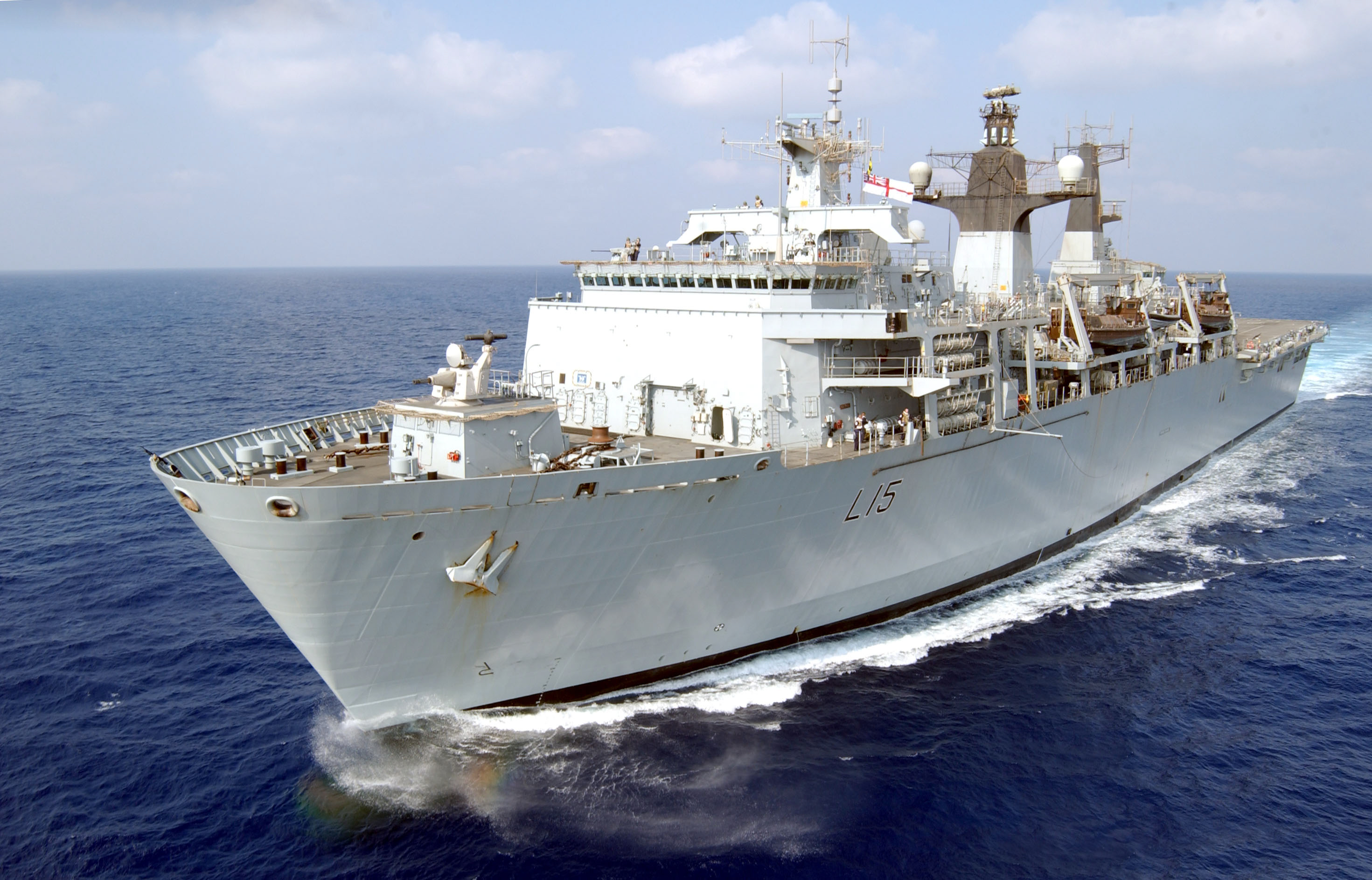
- HMS Bulwark is seen after disembarking 1,000 passengers in Cyprus
- Operational scope: Rescue/evacuation
- Locations: Beirut, Lebanon; 33.9026°N 35.5119°E; Akrotiri, Cyprus; 34.5695°N 32.9364°E (Note: Evacuees were offloaded at Larnaca, Limassol and at the military base of Akrotiri and Dhekelia. Coords given are for the hospital at RAF Akrotiri used to treat some of the evacuees, but also United States Armed Forces helicopters used the base on Cyprus.)
- Commanded by: Royal Navy
- Objective: Evacuation of British nationals from Lebanon
- Date: 15 July 2006 (UTC+02:00)
- Executed by: Royal Navy, British Army, Royal Air Force, UK Government
- Outcome: Successful evacuation of between 3,500 and 4,000 civilians
- Casualties: 0

Operation Highbrow was a British Ministry of Defence (MoD) operation to evacuate civilians from Beirut as a result of the escalating 2006 Lebanon War. Initially, helicopters started ferrying the most vulnerable to Cyprus with several Royal Navy ships later transporting evacuees across the Mediterranean Sea to Cyprus. The operation involved Royal Navy surface ships and helicopters, with Royal Air Force helicopters also providing support and transit. The operation was described as being the largest evacuation that Britain was involved in since Dunkirk.

The parallel French operation is Opération Baliste, which involved French Navy and French Army assets. They evacuated some 14,500 people had been evacuated (including 11,300 French citizens).

== Background ==
On 12 July 2006, in an effort to kill Mohammed Deif, leader of Hamas' Military Wing, Israeli jets bombed a house in Gaza. In retaliation, Hezbollah entered into Israel from Lebanon and killed three Israeli soldiers, taking two hostage. Later that same day, Israeli aircraft struck several targets inside Lebanon including many main roads in the north of the country, and the main runway at Beirut Airport. The UK Government started to work on plans to use either an air or seabridge to evacuate British nationals. Whilst both warring sides attacked each other, Britons were advised to lie-low until the navy ships arrived. People who had considered evacuating to Syria were told stories by those inside Lebanon about how people were killed on the road to the north by the bombings.

By 13 July, with the main runway at Beirut airport out of action, and a naval blockade of Lebanon by the Israeli Navy, the UK Government turned its planning into a airbridge with careful co-ordination between the Israeli Air Force and Lebanese authorities.

At the time of the conflict, the highest percentages of foreign nationals in Lebanon was 40,000 from Canada, 30,000 from the Philippines, 25,000 from Australia, 25,000 from the United States, 22,000 from Great Britain (of which 10,000 had dual nationality), and 20,000 from France. The Foreign Office contacted the estimated 22,000 who were deemed to be allowed to evacuate, and established that around 5,000 people wanted to leave the country. HMS Illustrious and HMS Gloucester were both on a security mission in the Indian Ocean in July 2006, when they were diverted to Operation Highbrow in the Mediterranean.

== The evacuation ==
With the airport at Beirut closed and roads within the region blocked, the best route out was via sea transport, with a short term flight in a military helicopter from the Port of Beirut to one of the awaiting ships, either, HMS Gloucester, HMS York, HMS St Albans, HMS Illustrious, HMS Bulwark, or RFA Fort Victoria. One civilian vessel was chartered for the operation (MV Alkioni). The Ministry of Defence (MoD) mobilised 2,500 serving personnel across the navy, army and air force, including 800 army personnel who provided a "spearhead land element", flying into Beirut by helicopters on 17 July 2006.

22 hours after being activated on 15 July, Royal Air Force Chinook helicopters from No. 27 Squadron, flew into Beirut to ferry British nationals direct to Cyprus, and then later onto waiting Royal Navy ships, which ferried them across the Mediterranean Sea to Cyprus. Similarly, six Sea King helicopters from No. 846 Naval Air Squadron based at RNAS Yeovilton, also deployed forward to Akrotiri to assist in the airbridge. They left on 18 July, with four stopovers for refuelling, and arrived in Cyprus 24 hours later. The helicopters were used primarily to get around the Israeli naval blockade. Some evacuees were processed at the military base on RAF Akrotiri, and had onward flights from there to Gatwick Airport arranged by private charter. When the number of evacuees involved became too great to be accommodated in the aircraft between the two ports at Beirut and Cyprus, shuttles were run from Beirut to Royal Navy ships outside the naval blockade area.

HMS Illustrious was due to leave Gibraltar with the families of serving personnel on board for the journey back to Portsmouth, however, this was cancelled at short notice and the helicopters from No. 800 Naval Air Squadron were offloaded at Gibraltar and she left for the eastern Mediterranean. Illustrious covered the 2,200-mile (3,500 km) journey in four days. The airbridge paths and patterns were overwatched by Sea King helicopters from HMS Illustrious, and Illustrious acted as a floating HQ. The Sea Kings were equipped with Airborne Surveillance and Control (ASAC) and kept watch on what the Israeli Air Force and opposing forces were doing to ensure safe flight paths. The first flights involved the Chinook helicopters ferrying the most vulnerable from Beirut straight to the military base of RAF Akrotiri. Initially, 60 people were evacuated, with some being treated at The Princess Mary's Hospital, RAF Akrotiri. Griffin helicopters from No. 84 Squadron based at RAF Akrotiri, were also used in the operation. Subsequent evacuations were handled by Royal Navy ships transporting evacuees across the Mediterranean Sea to Cyprus. Illustrious anchored offshore, but HMS Gloucester was allowed into the port at Beirut. Whilst RFA Fort Victoria was not directly involved in transporting evacuees, she aided the operation by supplying the other ships with fuel, bedding and other essentials.

The first ship out, HMS Gloucester, left on 18 July carrying 163 people. HMS York conveyed 600 evacuees in three trips and HMS Bulwark took over 1,300, of which 300 were children. HMS St Albans took 243 people, and the MV Alkioni, hired in from the Greece, carried 1,000 in two trips. HMS Gloucester carried three trips in total, safely carrying 766 people to Cyprus.

The operation came to an end on 22 July 2006, with between 3,500 and 4,400 UK personnel evacuated. The number of people evacuated led to the government describing the operation as the biggest rescue since Dunkirk. The Royal Naval Sea Kings of 846 Squadron remained at Cyprus to ferry diplomats around the region.

== Military units ==
=== Royal Navy ===
- HMS Illustrious
- HMS Bulwark
- HMS Gloucester
- HMS York
- HMS St. Albans
- RFA Fort Victoria
- 845 Fleet Air Arm Squadron (S-61 Sea King)
- 846 Fleet Air Arm Squadron (S-61 Sea King)

=== Royal Air Force ===
- No. 27 Squadron (CH-47D Chinook)

=== Army ===
- C Company, 2nd Battalion The Light Infantry (2 LI)

== Aftermath ==
On 18 August 2006, HMS St Albans returned to her home port of Portsmouth after evacuating 243 people from Beirut to Cyprus. The ship stayed out one-month longer than her original return date. The hospital at RAF Akrotiri was awarded the Wilkinson Sword of Peace in recognition of their efforts during the operation.
