= Extreme points of Cyprus =

This is a list of the extreme points of Cyprus: the points that are farther north, south, east or west than any other location.

== Longitude / Latitude ==
=== Mainland Cyprus ===
- North : Cape Apostolos Andreas (35°42′N 34°35′E)
- South : Cape Gata (34°34′N 33°1′E)
- West : Cape Arnauti (35°3′N 32°16′E)
- East : Cape Apostolos Andreas (35°42′N 34°35′E)

=== Including offshore islands ===
- North : Klidhes Islands (35°43′N 34°36′E)
- South : Cape Gata (34°34′N 33°1′E)
- West : Cape Arnauti (35°3′N 32°16′E)
- East : Klidhes Islands (35°43′N 34°36′E)

== Altitude ==
- Highest point : Mount Olympus, 1 951 m
- Lowest point : Mediterranean Sea, 0 m.

The maximum depth of the Limassol Salt Lake, which dries up in the summer, reaches 2.8 m below mean sea level.

== See also ==
- Extreme points of Europe
- Extreme points of Earth
- Geography of Cyprus
