= Akrotiri Peninsula =

Akrotiri Peninsula may refer to:

- Akrotiri Peninsula (Cyprus)
- Akrotiri Peninsula (Crete)
