= The Princess Mary's Hospital, RAF Akrotiri =

Former British military hospital in Cyprus

The Princess Mary's Hospital, RAF Akrotiri (TPMH)
- RAF Akrotiri, Cyprus

Geography
- Location: RAF Akrotiri, Akrotiri Peninsula, Limassol, Cyprus
- Coordinates: 34.5696°N 32.9373°E

Organisation
- Care system: Ministry of Defence

Services
- Emergency department: Yes
- Beds: 155–200

Helipads
- Helipad: Yes

History
- Founded: 1963
- Closed: 2013
- Demolished: 2015–16

Links
- Lists: Hospitals in Cyprus

The Princess Mary's Hospital, RAF Akrotiri, (often abbreviated to TPMH) (Note: Its full title was The Princess Mary's Hospital, RAF Akrotiri. This became The Princess Mary's Hospital, Akrotiri when the medical services were amalgamated into a tri-service unit in 1996.), was a military hospital located on the Royal Air Force base at Akrotiri on the island of Cyprus. The hospital was the last British military hospital to remain in operation after all other hospitals had closed down in the 1990s and 2000s. (Note: This does not include the medical facilities built in Camp Bastion during Operation Herrick) Originally the site was a dedicated RAF Hospital, but since 1996 it had been a Defence Medical Services asset. The hospital provided care for service personnel, their dependants and the local Cypriot population. It also treated many others from non-British and non-Cypriot countries. The setting of the hospital gave rise to the nickname Alcatraz, and it was staffed by personnel from the Royal Air Force and the British Army.

It treated its last case, and stopped affording treatment, in October 2012, but formal closure of the building came in 2013. The hospital and associated structures were demolished between 2015 and 2016. Medical care for military personnel on the island is now the remit of a health care centre at RAF Akrotiri and more serious cases are dealt with by Cypriot healthcare in the nearby city of Limassol.

== History ==
A temporary hospital had existed at Akrotiri since 1957 when troops were moved out of Egypt after the Suez Crisis. Initially, this was a set of prefabricated bungalows cobbled together until a more permanent structure was created, and was located as part of the base complex itself. (Note: This location was redeveloped for housing for service personnel posted to RAF Akrotiri who arrived with their families.)

The architect for the hospital was Alister MacDonald, son of Ramsay MacDonald. The hospital was named after Princess Mary, who had agreed in 1923 to be the patron of the Princess Mary's Royal Air Force Nursing Service. The hospital was built 3 miles (4.8 km) west of the airfield because of a perceived threat of bombing from foreign aircraft. Building of the hospital on Cape Zevgari (Note: Zevgari means Yoked, and is said to derive from two rocks south of the cape said to resemble oxen.) began in June 1961 and cost an estimated £1 million. (Note: This price was accurate as of 1961. The large bill is credited to the reinforced concrete used as earthquake protection.) The hospital was opened in stages between May and June 1963, which allowed for the old hospital to be rundown without loss of patient service. The new hospital was formally opened in November 1963 by Princess Mary. Due to its remote location from the rest of the RAF base, its northern flank consisting of brown earth, sea to the south and the building's design; it soon acquired the nickname of Alcatraz.

The hospital had a design capacity for 200 beds, though it was hardly ever used in such numbers. It had opened with 155 beds, which was increased to 170 in 1972, but had dropped to 120 in 1978. This had been announced in the 1975 Defence Review, where the number of beds across all military hospitals was to drop by 20% and the hospitals at Wroughton and Tidworth were slated for closure. Service personnel and their dependents were the primary users of the hospital, though any nationalities were treated when they needed emergency care. During the 1974 Turkish invasion of Cyprus, the hospital was the only facility that could deliver impartial care to both sides. Treatment of Cypriots for non-emergency cases was undertaken on the availability of bed-spaces and a repayment for the medical care offered. This was stated to be good for the community and also as a way of "widen[ing] the case mix and the professional training and experience of service doctors." One former resident doctor, described what the hospital was like in its heyday (1960s/1970s); "20,000 out-patients and 5,000 in-patients were cared for annually". Due to its throughput and variety of cases, medical training was also undertaken at the hospital throughout the 1970s.

Whilst it was located on an RAF base and named as such, the hospital was there to cater for all military personnel and was therefore staffed with Air Force staff (PMRAFNS) and also with British Army personnel drawn from the QARANC in a 60/40 split respectively.

In July 1974, a military coup in Cyprus resulted in a Turkish incursion six days later. Seventy-one people were treated in the hospital for shrapnel wounds. In October 1983, American and French service personnel were evacuated to TPMH after simultaneous bomb attacks on their barracks in the Lebanese city of Beirut. A Department of Defence inquiry afterwards found that many more would have died had the RAF not offered its helicopters and its healthcare as Akrotiri was only a 1-hour flight from Beirut, whereas other military hospitals in Germany were 4-hours flight time away. The report stated

Medical care provided to the wounded by the various treatment facilities was excellent. The disaster plan of the[sic] The Princess Mary[sic] RAF Hospital at Akrotiri, Cyprus was exceptionally effective in concept and execution. The ability to use this facility, under these extreme circumstances, significantly minimized mortality and morbidity.

In late 1990, with Operation Granby building up in the Middle East, TPMH extended its capability from 60 permanent beds to its design capacity of 200 beds. Dormant wards were reactivated and a separate 300-bed triage facility was established nearer to the airfield. In the event, casualty numbers were lower than anticipated, and so the facility was returned to normal operations as soon as hostilities ceased. During this time, the hospital treated the RAF aircrew Flight Lieutenants John Nicol and John Peters after they had been released from captivity. In 1991, Jackie Mann, Terry Waite and John McCarthy were all given a medical examination upon their release from captivity before being taken by aircraft to RAF Lyneham in Wiltshire.

In March 1996, the RAF military hospitals at Wroughton and Halton closed, as did the last one in Germany, Wegberg, along with two army hospitals too. The last military hospitals were transferred to the newly formed Defence Secondary Care Agency, and so the TPMH was renamed as The Princess Mary's Hospital, Akrotiri. In 1999, the secondary care specialisations at the hospital were described as "..anaesthetics, general medicine, general surgery, orthopaedic surgery, obstetrics and gynaecology and oral maxillo-facial surgery." In the same year, the number of staff was listed as being 124; 80 drawn from military personnel and 44 from a civilian workforce.

During what was described as "an intense phase" of Operation Telic in early 2003, casualties were treated at the hospital in conjunction with those flown back to the UK for treatment at University Hospital in Birmingham. The hospital also treated wounded media operatives from that conflict. Between December 2006 and November 2007, the hospital had between 140 and 150 staff and had treated 12,848 patients. After the closure of the Royal Naval hospitals at Haslar and Gibraltar in 2007 and 2008 respectively, TPMH remained the only peacetime military hospital in existence.

TPMH saw their last patients in October 2012, and formal closure of the hospital came in 2013. After closure, the medical needs for service personnel were catered for by a new health centre on RAF Akrotiri, as primary medical care, with more intricate medical needs provided by a Cypriot independent provider.

The site was demolished in 2016.

== Recognition ==
TPMH was awarded the Wilkinson Sword of Peace three times during its history; for the Cyprus Emergency in 1974, in 2002 for its benefit to the wider community and in 2006, for its support to Operation Highbrow.

== Notable incidents ==
- February 1964 – the Cyprus crisis of 1963–1964 caused many casualties, with most being treated at TPMH.
- 20 July 1974 – During the Turkish invasion of 1974, many local people were evacuated from Kyrenia by a Royal Navy aircraft carrier and other assorted ships. The wounded were treated at TPMH.
- 22 July 1974 – the Turkish destroyer TCG Kocatepe was accidentally attacked by a Star Fighter from the Turkish Air Force. The wounded were treated at TPMH.
- 7 December 1977 – a U-2 aircraft crashed on take-off from RAF Akrotiri. It collided with the meteorological office, killing four people on the ground and the pilot. The injured were treated at TPMH.
- 23 October 1983 – the 1983 Beirut barracks bombings; Chinook and Wessex helicopters assigned to Operation Pulsator, ferried wounded service personnel to the hospital after suffering a bomb attack in Beirut.
- 3 August 1986 – the base was subjected to a terrorist attack by the United Nasserite Organization in retaliation for the base being a launching point for the attacks on Libya in April of the same year.
- 20 November 1989 – a truck with Coldstream Guards came off the mountain road as it was descending the Troodos Mountains in Cyprus. Eight soldiers died, with at least thirteen being ferried to, and treated at, TPMH.
- October 1993 – 19 members of the ship's crew of the Royal Yacht Britannia were treated for an outbreak of Salmonella. The yacht had a complement of 220 and none of the royal family aboard the ship were affected.

== Commanding officers ==
Listed below are the Commanding Officers for the hospital

=== The Princess Mary's Hospital, RAF Akrotiri ===
- Group Captain G H Dhenin, May – December 1963
- Group Captain G R Bedford, December 1963 – November 1966
- Group Captain T H Redfern, November 1966 – October 1969
- Group Captain J A B Mounsey, October 1969 – October 1972
- Group Captain J G Donald, October 1972 – January 1976
- Group Captain I M Ogilvie, January 1976 – March 1977
- Group Captain D O Williams, March 1977 – August 1978
- Group Captain M A Pallister, August 1978 – September 1980
- Group Captain R C Davie, October 1980 – October 1982
- Group Captain R Chapple, October 1982 – March 1985
- Group Captain E P Collins, March 1985 – July 1987
- Group Captain K S Prior, July 1987 – June 1988
- Group Captain S A Cullen, June 1988 – December 1990
- Group Captain W J Pike, December 1990 – November 1992
- Group Captain J T G Rogerson, November 1992 – September 1994
- Group Captain P K L Coles, September 1994 – March 1996

=== The Princess Mary's Hospital, Akrotiri ===
- Group Captain P K L Coles, April 1996 – September 1996
- Group Captain S R C Dougherty, September 1996 – February 1999
- Group Captain J M Jones, February 1999 – December 2000
- Group Captain D L McConnell, December 2000 – April 2003
- Group Captain R J M Broadbridge, April 2003 – July 2005
- Wing Commander A Cranfield, August 2005 – December 2006
- Group Captain D I T Jenkins, December 2006 – May 2008
- Group Captain J E Gaffney, May 2008 – June 2010
- Group Captain A N C Reid, June 2010 – August 2012
- Group Captain G E Allison, August 2012 – 2013
