= Episkopi Bay =

Bay west of the Akrotiri Peninsula

Coordinates: 34°38′N 32°50′E

- Episkopi Bay is to the west of the Akrotiri Peninsula
- Interactive map of Episkopi Bay
- Location: Mediterranean Sea
- Basin countries: Cyprus、Akrotiri and Dhekelia

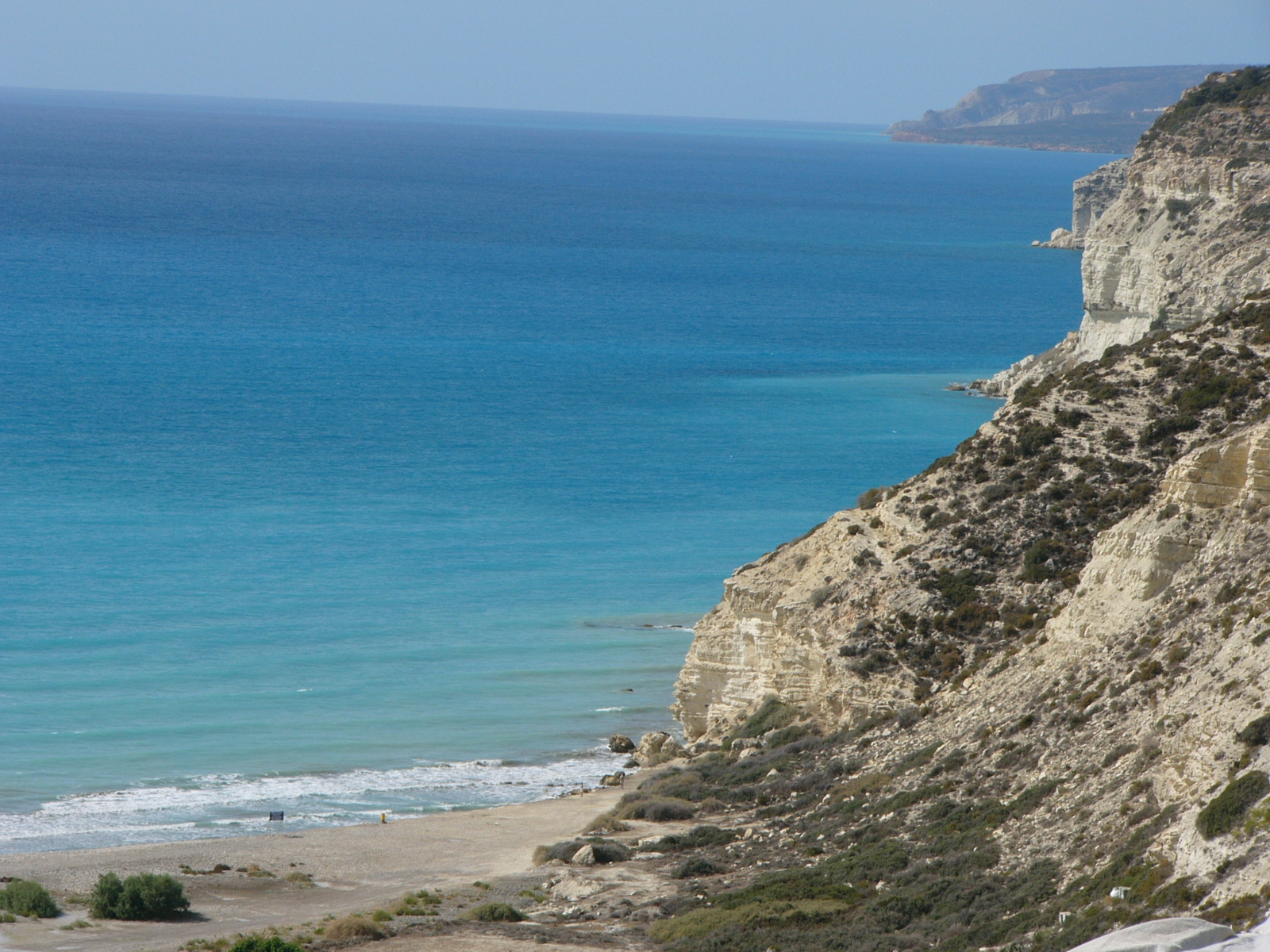
Episkopi Bay viewed from Kourion

Episkopi Bay (Greek: Κόλπος Επισκοπής; Turkish: Piskobu Körfezi) is a bay west of the Akrotiri Peninsula on the south-western shore of Cyprus, between Paphos and Akrotiri. On the other side of the Akrotiri Peninsula is Akrotiri Bay. It is famous for its beaches and fish restaurants. Despite the Turkish invasion and ensuing ethnic division of Cyprus in 1974, a number of Turkish Cypriots chose to remain in the area.

Episkopi Bay is a nesting ground for green and loggerhead turtles, both of which are on the IUCN list of endangered species. Episkopi Turtle Watch is a local volunteer group dedicated to the conservation of the turtles and their nesting beaches.
