= Cape Zevgari =

Coordinates: 34.568°N 32.934°E

Cape Zevgari is the south-western cape of the Akrotiri Peninsula on the southern coast of Cyprus, near the city of Limassol.

Cape Zevgari lies within Akrotiri and Dhekelia, a British Overseas Territory on the island of Cyprus, administered as a Sovereign Base Area. It is located in the Western Sovereign Base Area and forms the south-west point of the Akrotiri Peninsula which is the most southerly part of the island. The cape forms the southern end of Episkopi Bay.

The cape lies within the boundaries of the Royal Air Force station known as RAF Akrotiri. The building on the cape was The Princess Mary's Hospital, RAF Akrotiri, the main hospital for British Forces Cyprus. The hospital was formerly an RAF hospital, but following the establishment of the Defence Medical Services organisation, it was a tri-service establishment under the authority of the Permanent Joint Headquarters at Northwood. The hospital closed on 1 November 2012.
