= HMS Bulwark =

Seven ships of the Royal Navy have borne the name HMS Bulwark, after the reference to the Navy as the 'bulwark' (defence) of the country:

- HMS Bulwark was to have been a 74-gun third rate. She was ordered in 1778 but was cancelled in 1783.
- HMS Bulwark (1807) was a 74-gun third rate launched in 1807. She was previously planned to be called HMS Scipio, but was renamed in 1806 before being launched. She took part in the blockade of Rochefort in 1813 and fought in the War of 1812. She was broken up in 1826.
- HMS Bulwark was to have been an 81-gun screw propelled Bulwark-class second rate. She was laid down in 1859, but work was suspended in 1861, and she was eventually cancelled and broken up in 1873.
- HMS Bulwark was previously the first rate HMS Howe. She was kept in reserve and was renamed Bulwark in 1885 when she became a training ship. She was renamed HMS Impregnable in 1886, and then HMS Bulwark again in 1919. She was sold for breaking up in 1921.
- HMS Bulwark (1899) was a London-class battleship launched in 1899 and blown up by accident in 1914.
- HMS Bulwark (R08) was a Centaur-class light fleet carrier launched in 1948, and commissioned as a fleet carrier in 1954. She was converted to a commando carrier in 1959, recommissioned in that role in January 1960. She was broken up in 1984.
- HMS Bulwark (L15) is an Albion-class amphibious assault ship launched in 2001 and transferred to the Brazilian Navy in 2025. Brazilians renamed her NDM Oiapoque.
