= Akrotiri Bay =

Bay on the island of Cyprus

- Κόλπος Ακρωτηρίου (Greek); Limasol Körfezi (Turkish)
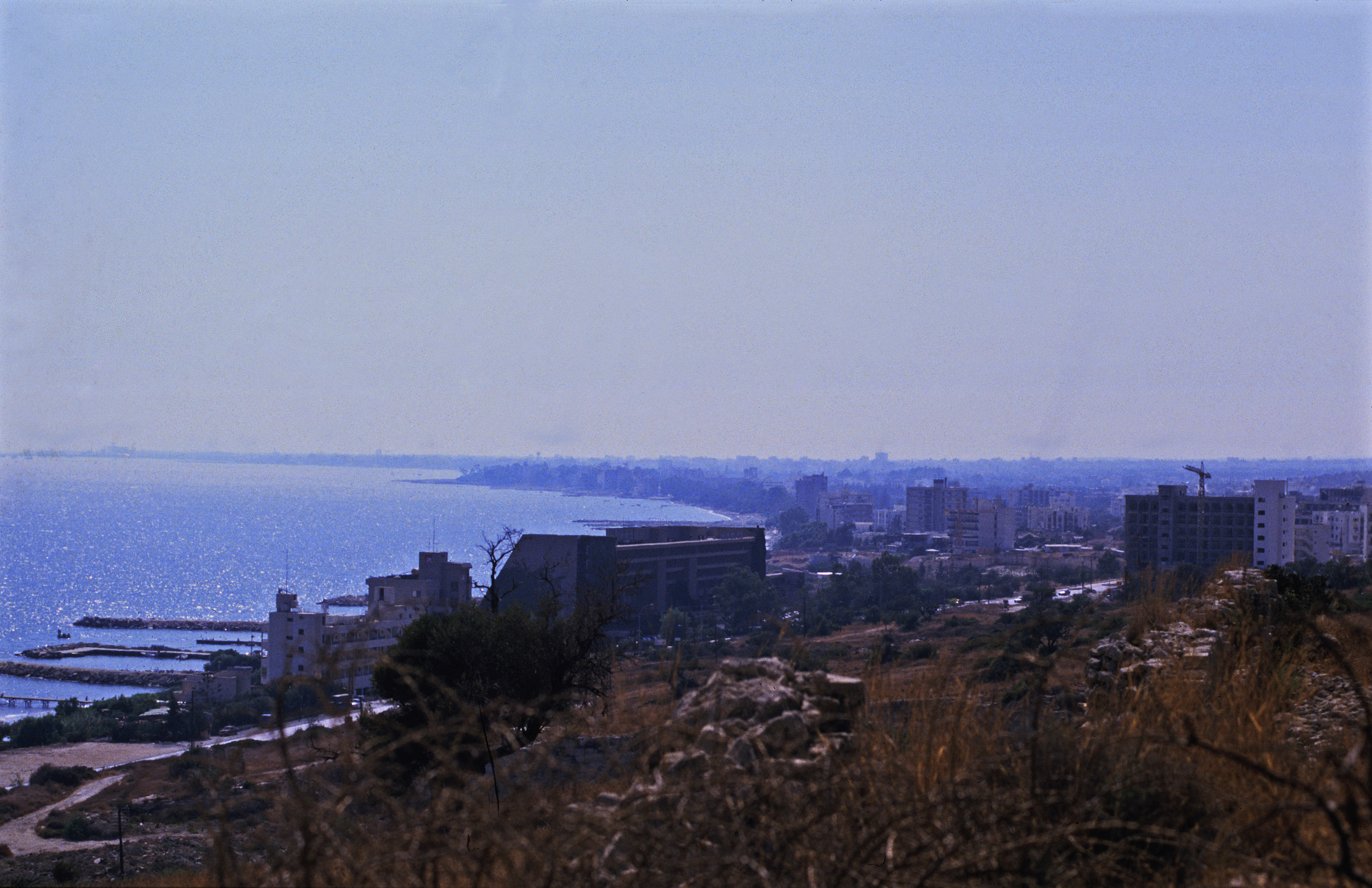
- View of Akrotiri Bay

- Location within Cyprus
- Interactive map of Akrotiri Bay
- Akrotiri Bay is to the east of the Akrotiri Peninsula
- Coordinates: 34°38′N 33°05′E
- Type: Bay
- Part of: Mediterranean Sea
- Basin countries: Cyprus
- Settlements: Limassol

Akrotiri Bay (Greek: Κόλπος Ακρωτηρίου, romanized: Kólpos Akrotiríou; Turkish: Limasol Körfezi) is a part of the Mediterranean Sea east of the Akrotiri Peninsula on the southern coast of the island of Cyprus, just west of the main part of Limassol District. The city of Limassol is also located on the bay. The southern end of the bay is formed by Cape Gata.
