= RAF Akrotiri =

Royal Air Force station on Cyprus

RAF Akrotiri
- Akrotiri in Sovereign Base Areas of Akrotiri and Dhekelia, Cyprus
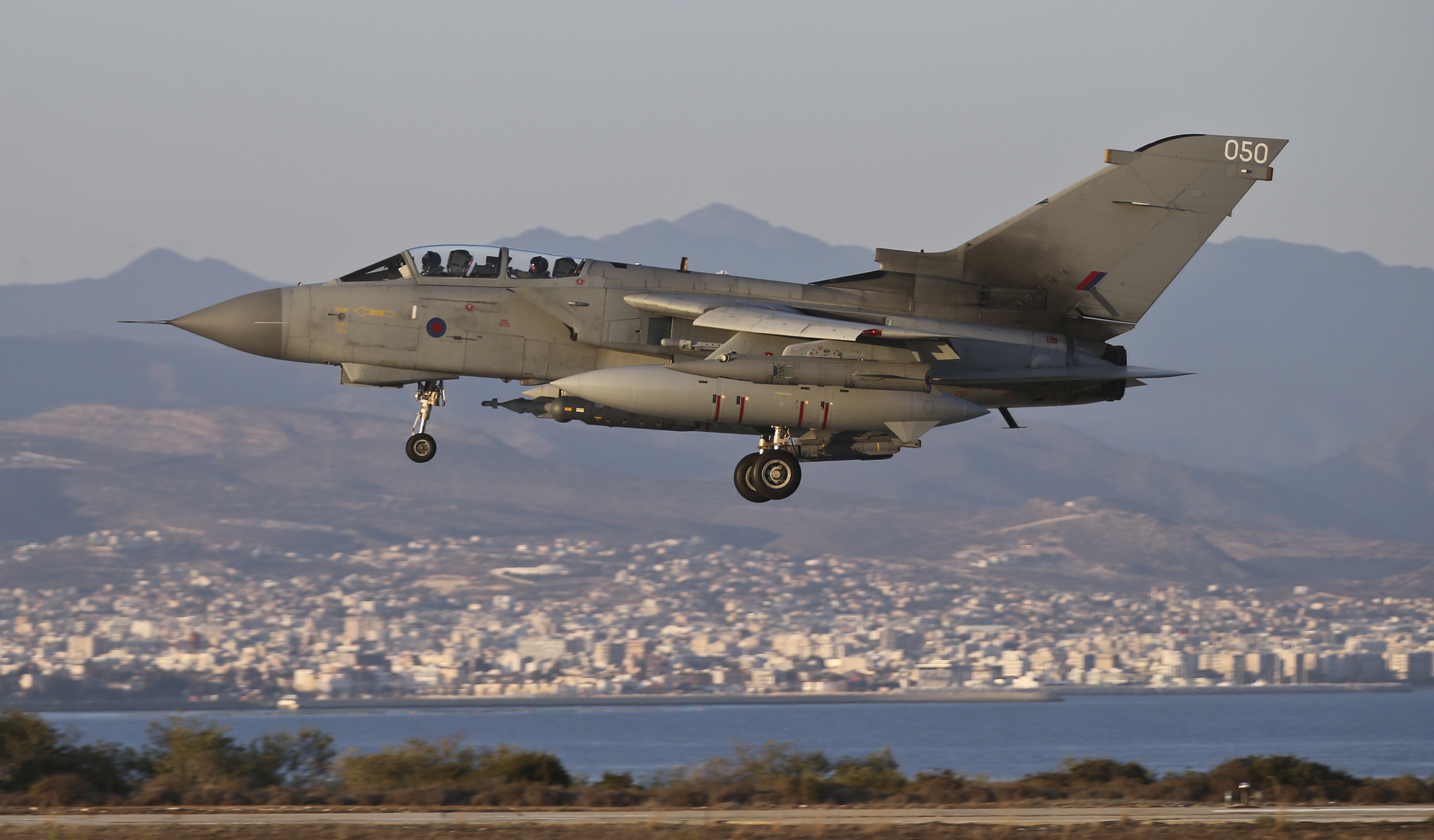
- An RAF Tornado GR4 returns to RAF Akrotiri after a mission undertaken during Operation Shader

- Acra semper acria (Latin for 'The Peninsula is Always Eager')

Site information
- Type: Permanent joint operating base
- Owner: Ministry of Defence
- Operator: Royal Air Force
- Controlled by: British Forces Cyprus
- Condition: operational
- Website: Official website

Location
- Location within Europe Location within Mediterranean Location within Cyprus
- Coordinates: 34°35′25″N 32°59′16″E
- Area: 2,128 hectares (5,260 acres)

Site history
- Built: 1 July 1955; 71 years ago
- In use: 1955 – present

Garrison information
- Current commander: Group Captain Adam Smolak
- Occupants: No. 84 Squadron RAF; No. 903 Expeditionary Air Wing; Cyprus Operations Support Unit

Airfield information
- Identifiers: IATA: AKT, ICAO: LCRA, WMO: 17601
- Elevation: 75.4 feet (23 metres) AMSL
Runways
Direction	Length and surface
10/28	2,745 by 45 metres (9,006 ft × 148 ft) grooved blacktop asphalt concrete
- Source: United Kingdom Military Aeronautical Information Publication

Royal Air Force Akrotiri, commonly abbreviated RAF Akrotiri (IATA: AKT, ICAO: LCRA) is a large Royal Air Force (RAF) military airbase on the Mediterranean island of Cyprus. It is located in the Western Sovereign Base Area, one of two areas which comprise Akrotiri and Dhekelia, a British Overseas Territory, administered as a Sovereign Base Area.

The station was constructed in the mid-1950s, and was the base for operations during the Suez Crisis in 1956, the EOKA revolt, and monitoring of the Egypt / Israel Suez Canal fighting and cease-fire in the 1970s. It went on to be used during the reception of American casualties after the 1983 Beirut barracks bombing and was used during the USA's bombing of Libya in 1986. It played a major role as a transit point for personnel evacuations out of Lebanon during the 2006 Lebanon War and was used as a staging base for support aircraft involved in Operation Ellamy, the UK's contribution to the NATO-led military intervention in Libya, in 2011.

In August 2014, RAF Panavia Tornado fighter-bombers were deployed to Akrotiri to carry out reconnaissance missions over Iraq, following the rise of Islamic State (ISIS) and in September 2014, British aircraft from the base intercepted and attacked an ISIS target, at the request of Iraqi Kurdish fighters. In 2018, the station was used to support the 2018 missile strikes against Syria and, in 2024, Typhoons based in Akrotiri struck Houthi targets in Yemen.

The station commander has a dual role, and is also the officer commanding the Akrotiri or Western Sovereign Base Area, reporting to the commander of British Forces Cyprus (BFC) who is also the Administrator.

== History ==
RAF Akrotiri was first constructed in the mid-1950s to relieve pressure on the main RAF station in the centre of the island, RAF Nicosia.

=== Suez Crisis ===
Location of RAF Akrotiri within the Western Sovereign Base Area

In late 1956, relations between the United Kingdom and Egypt had reached a crisis. The Suez Crisis saw a further increase in the strength of RAF forces in Cyprus. Akrotiri was mainly an airfield for fighter, photo reconnaissance, and ground attack aircraft. Its regular squadrons of Gloster Meteor night fighters, English Electric Canberra photo reconnaissance aircraft, and de Havilland Venom ground attack machines were reinforced by further Canberras which were ready for action if Egypt attacked Israel.

=== 1960s ===
After the Suez Crisis, the main emphasis of life on the airfield shifted to helping fight the EOKA revolt, and training missions. After the withdrawal from both Egypt and Iraq, and Suez Crisis, it was clear that a command centred on Cyprus could not control units stationed in the Arabian Peninsula, of which there were still many. Consequently, the Middle East Command was split; with that east of Suez being controlled from Aden, Yemen, and the remainder being renamed the Near East Command, controlled from Cyprus. From 1957 to 1969, four squadrons operating the Canberra (No. 6 Squadron, No. 32 Squadron, No. 73 Squadron, and No. 249 Squadron) provided first a conventional and then from November 1961, a nuclear striking capability as part of the Baghdad Pact, later the Central Treaty Organization (CENTO).

Akrotiri, along with Nicosia, assumed a very important status, as virtually the sole means for projecting British airpower into the eastern Mediterranean, outside of aircraft carriers. In 1960, independence was won by Cyprus, with the RAF maintaining both RAF Nicosia and RAF Akrotiri as airfields, controlled by the Near East Air Force (NEAF). However, Akrotiri assumed more importance as Nicosia was used for greater civil aviation traffic. After 1966, it was no longer possible to maintain RAF units at Nicosia due to pressures of space, and Akrotiri became the only RAF flying station left on the island.

=== 1970s ===
In August 1970, detachment 'G' of the Central Intelligence Agency (CIA) arrived at the airfield with Lockheed U-2 reconnaissance aircraft to monitor the Egypt / Israel Suez Canal fighting and cease-fire. Permanent monitoring of the Middle East Ceasefire was undertaken by the 100th Strategic Reconnaissance Wing after the 1973 Yom Kippur War, known as Operation 'OLIVE HARVEST'.

Up until 1974, RAF Akrotiri had a balanced force of aircraft assigned to it, including No. 9 Squadron and No. 35 Squadron, both flying Avro Vulcan strategic bombers. The Vulcans provided a bomber force for CENTO, one of the three main anti-Communist mutual defence pacts signed in the early days of the Cold War. However, during that year, Turkish forces invaded Cyprus in connection with a Greek-sponsored coup. The UK then evacuated most of the RAF from Akrotiri as the CENTO treaty had degenerated to the point of uselessness. The two Vulcan squadrons left for UK stations in 1975. What was left at the airfield was the flying unit that is permanently assigned to the station to this day; No. 84 Squadron, a helicopter search and rescue unit. In addition, the role of No. 34 Squadron RAF Regiment provided support.

In September 1976, the US U-2 operations were reassigned to the 9th Strategic Reconnaissance Wing (9th SRW), but the U-2 operation at RAF Akrotiri continued to be called Operating Location (OLIVE HARVEST) OH until September 1980. Thereafter, it became Detachment 3 of the 9th SRW, although the name OLIVE HARVEST continues. Two U-2s are stationed at RAF Akrotiri, and they are still monitoring the ceasefire agreement between the Egypt and Israel, although the present operations in the US Central Command area requires further missions. U-2s also transit through RAF Akrotiri either on going into the Central Command theatre, or returning to Beale AFB, California.

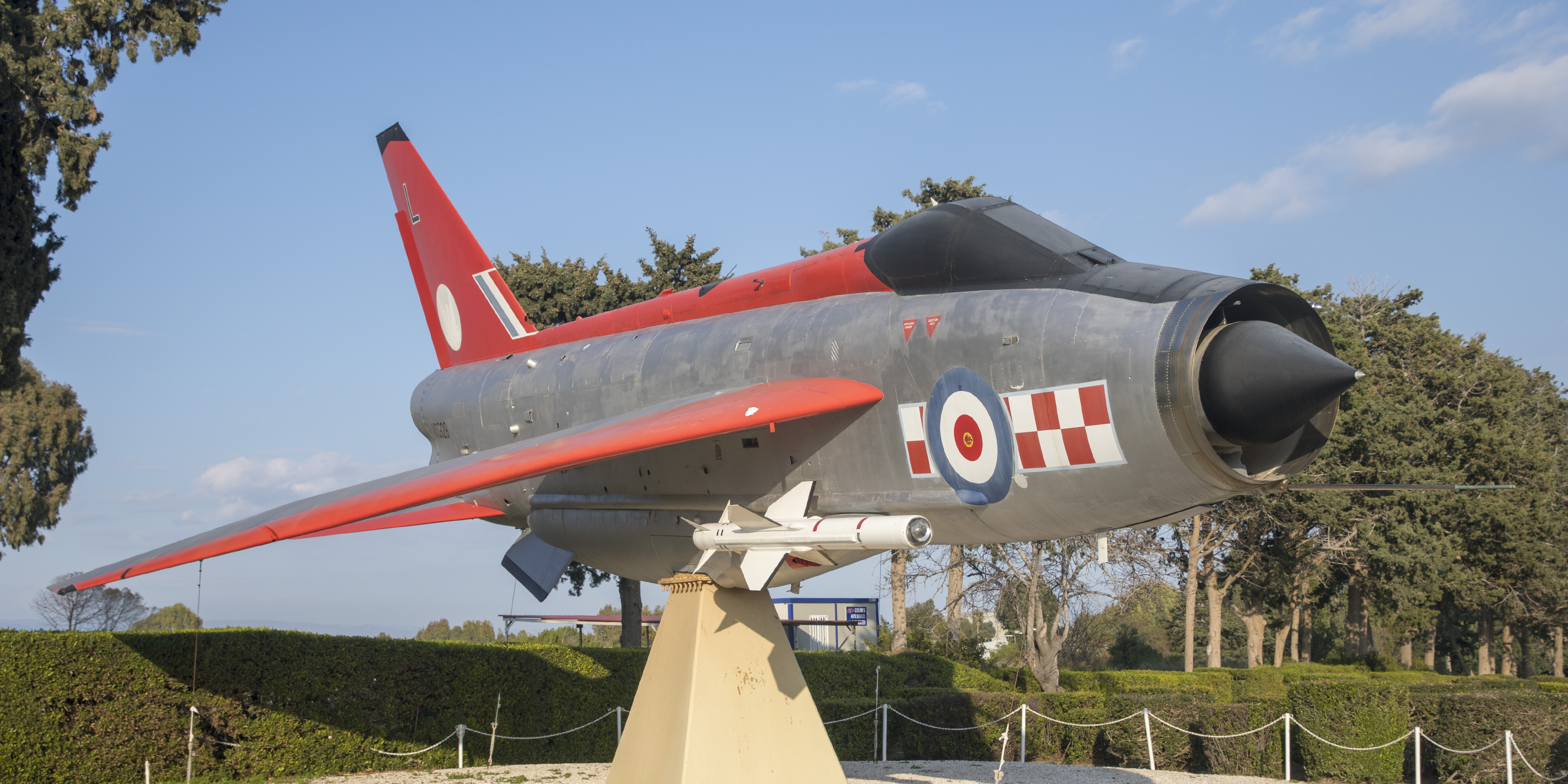
English Electric Lightning F.6 (XS929), displayed as a gate guardian at RAF Akrotiri in Cyprus which arrived during June 1988, straight from RAF Binbrook

=== 1980s and 1990s ===
Due to the station's relative proximity to the Middle East, it was used for the reception of American casualties after the 1983 Beirut barracks bombing.

Between April 1983 and September 1984, RAF Boeing Chinook helicopters deployed to Akrotiri in support of British United Nations forces in Lebanon (UNIFIL).

In the mid-1980s, the US launched retaliatory attacks against Libya after the country's leader, Muammar al-Gaddafi, was implicated in the bombing of a West Berlin discotheque. Although the bombing operations were staged out of the UK, Akrotiri was employed in the role of an alternate in case of emergency, and was used as such by at least one aircraft. This led to retaliatory action against the British base.

Declassified files from 1993 indicate that Akrotiri base was used by the UK to secretly move sensitive equipment to and from Cyprus. File entries said Cyprus was "one of the few areas where the UK can make a substantial and unique contribution to the UK/US intelligence exchange" because "its location gives access to certain intelligence targets not otherwise accessible".

=== 2000s–2010s ===
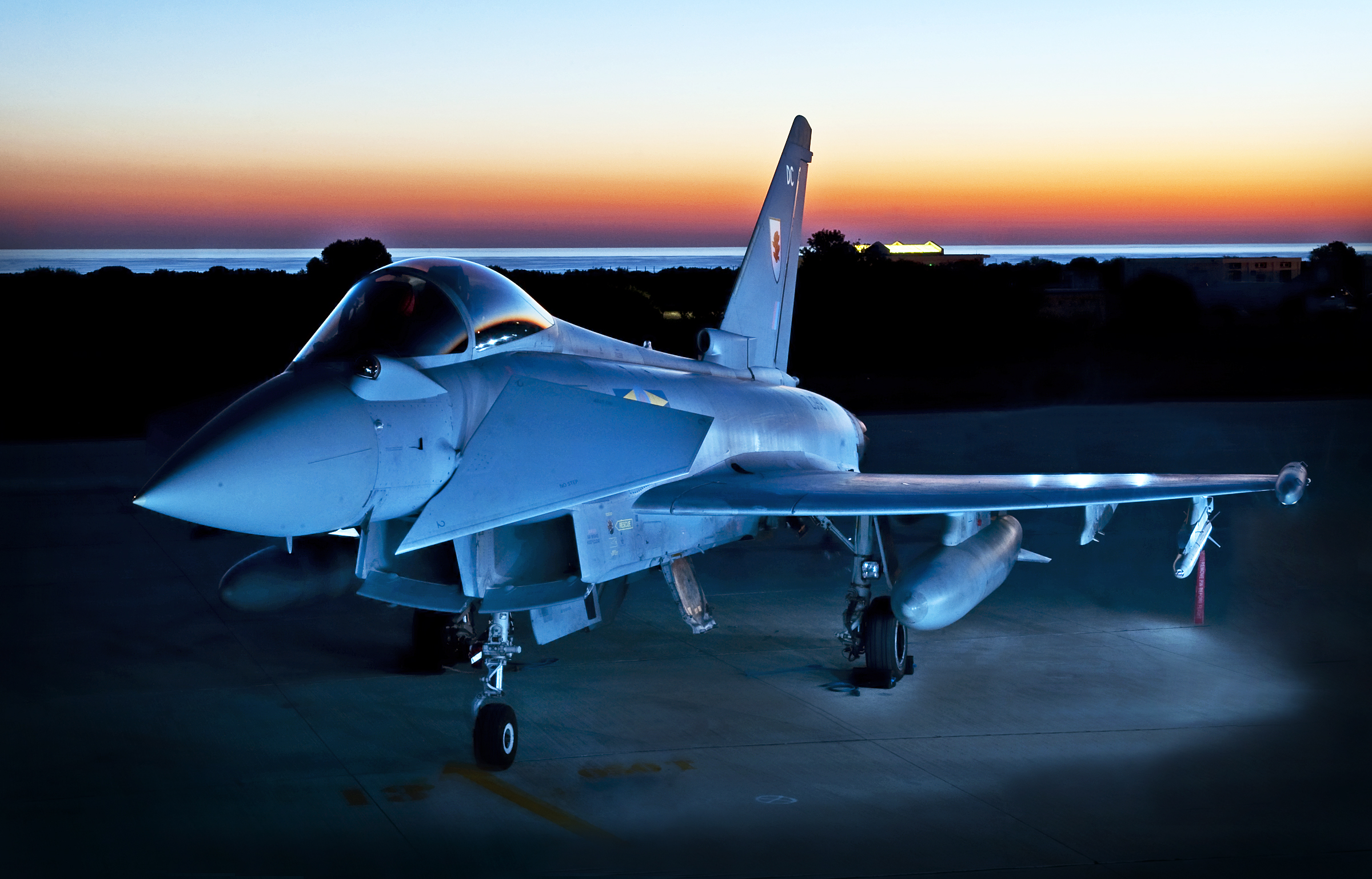
An 11 Squadron Eurofighter Typhoon parked at RAF Akrotiri.

In July 2006, RAF Akrotiri played a major role as a transit point for personnel evacuations out of Lebanon during the 2006 Lebanon War (see international reactions to the 2006 Lebanon War and Joint Task Force Lebanon).

Akrotiri was the location of the main transmitter of the well known numbers station, the Lincolnshire Poacher, although transmissions ceased in 2008.

In March 2011, the station was used as a staging base for support aircraft involved in Operation Ellamy, the UK's contribution to the NATO-led military intervention in Libya. Tanker support and logistical units were based here to support aerial operations over the country.

In August 2013, six RAF Eurofighter Typhoon aircraft were deployed to Akrotiri to defend the base, "to ensure the protection of UK interests and the defence of our sovereign base areas at a time of heightened tension in the wider region". Earlier, two RAF Lockheed TriStar aerial refuelling aircraft and a Boeing Sentry AEW1 had been deployed to Akrotiri.

The station hosted the main hospital for British Forces Cyprus, The Princess Mary's Hospital (TPMH), located on Cape Zevgari. This closed in October 2012, and cases too serious to be dealt with at the base health clinic are sent to the private Ygia Polyclinic in Limassol.

In August 2014, six RAF Panavia Tornado fighter-bombers were deployed to Akrotiri to carry out reconnaissance missions over Iraq, following the rise of Islamic State (ISIS) in Iraq and Syria. On 26 September 2014, Members of Parliament voted in favour of the RAF carrying out air strikes on ISIS in Iraq, and on 27 September the first two Tornado jets took off from Akrotiri loaded with laser-guided bombs and missiles. On 30 September 2014, two British Tornados successfully intercepted and attacked ISIS targets of a heavily armed truck, at the request of Iraqi Kurdish fighters.

Work started in the summer of 2015 on upgrading Akrotiri's airfield infrastructure. The £46m project included the resurfacing of the runway, taxiways and aircraft aprons and installation of ground lighting systems, drainage infrastructure and runway hydraulic arrestor gear. The project was completed in March 2017.

The station was used to support the 2018 missile strikes against Syria.

In June 2019, the station launched the RAF's first Lockheed Martin F-35 Lightning II operational sortie. Six aircraft were deployed to take part in operations against Islamic State.

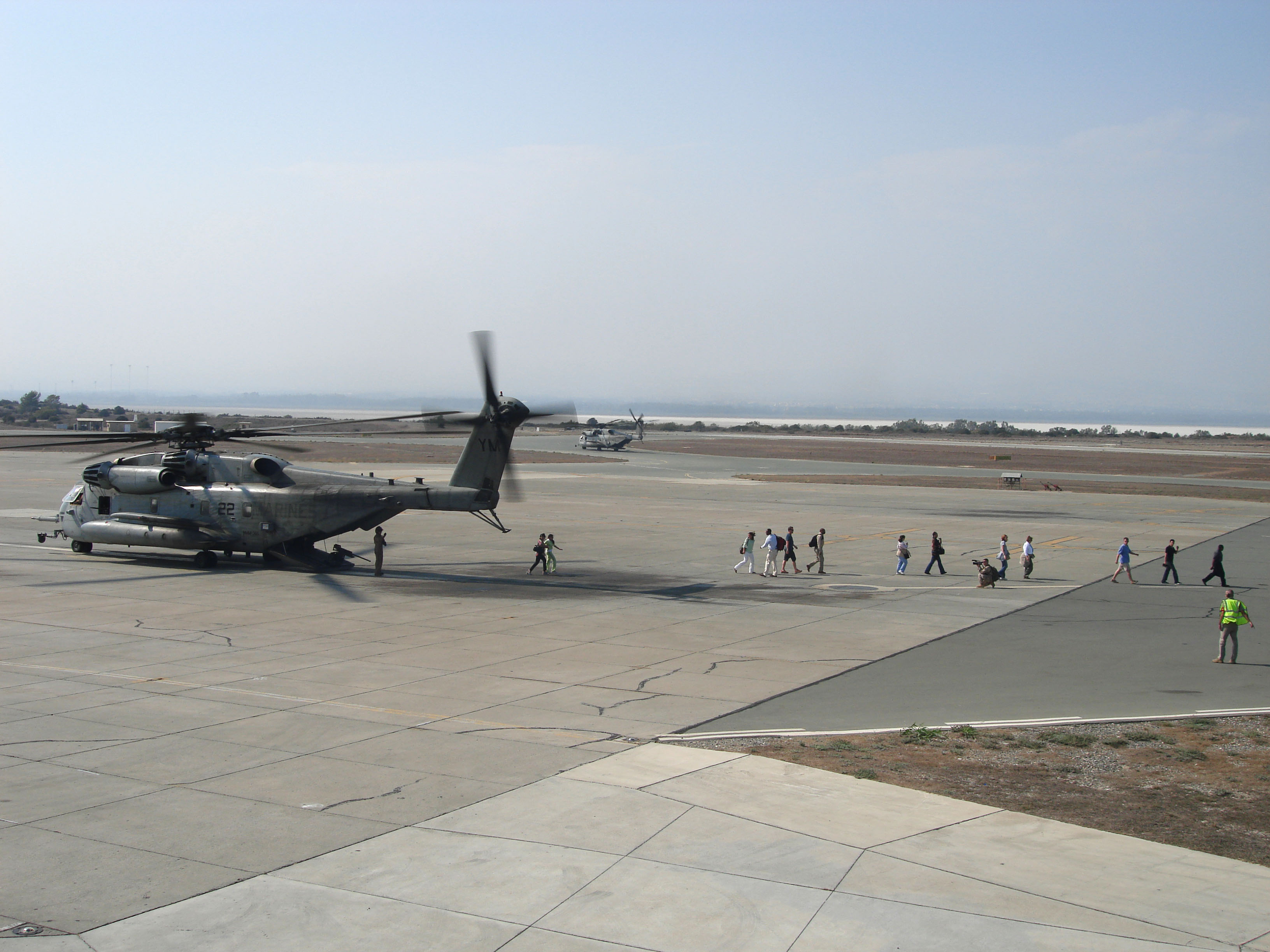
U.S. Marines helicopter at RAF Akrotiri.

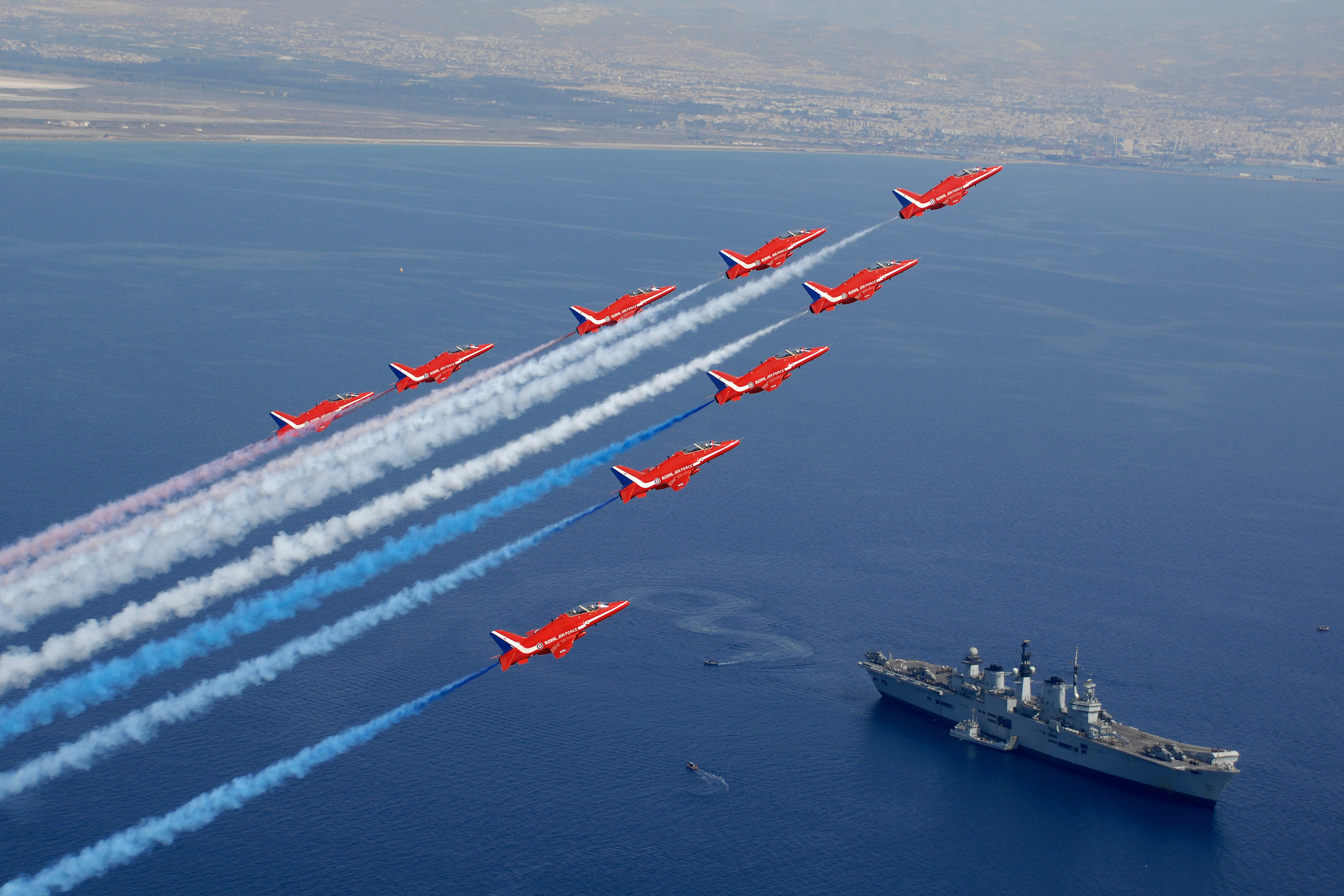
Red Arrows flying over HMS Illustrious (R06) next to Akrotiri.

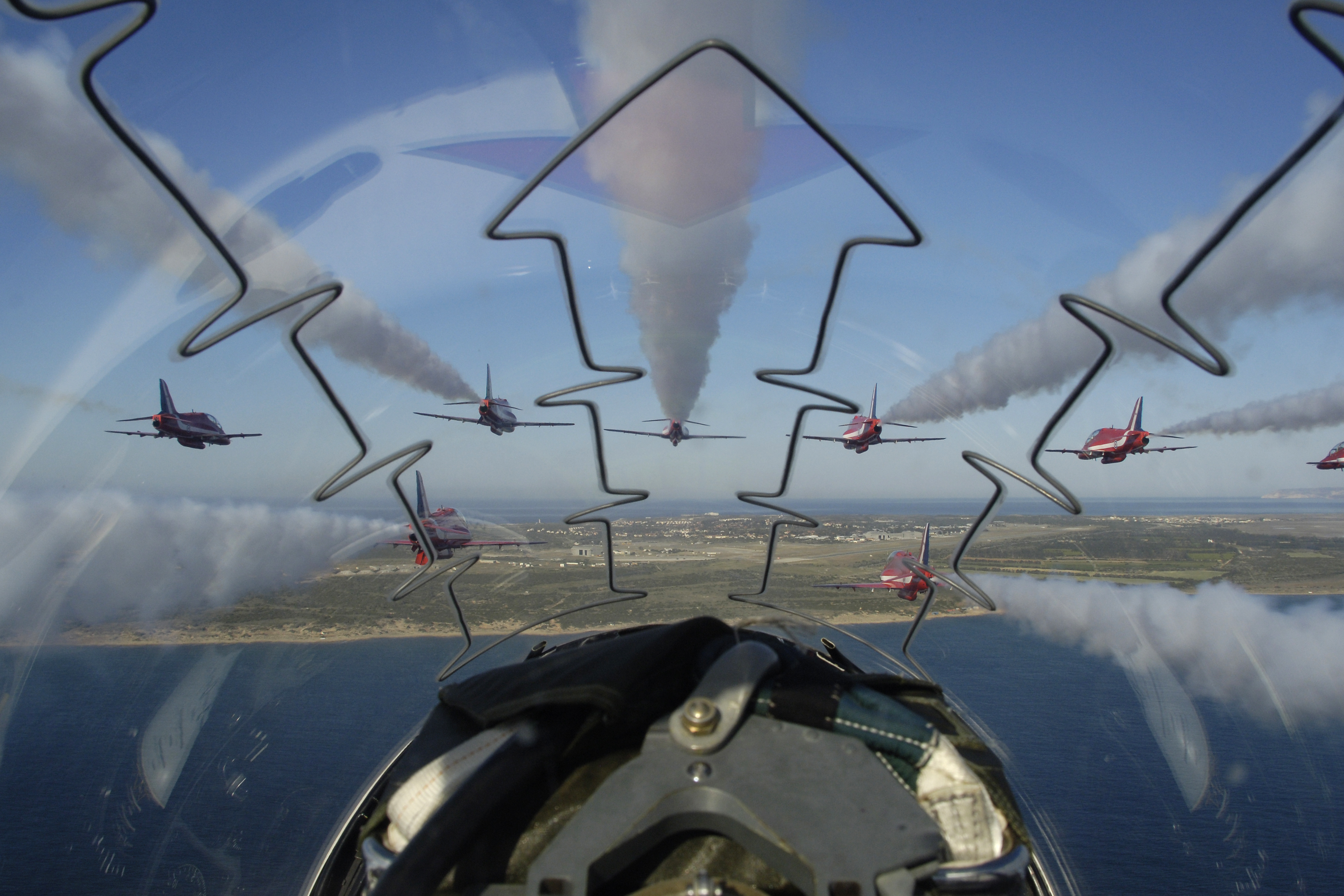
View of Akrotiri from the cockpit of a Hawk T1

=== 2020s ===
Flight logs indicated that UK military transport aircraft made numerous flights from Akrotiri to Tel Aviv's Ben Gurion Airport during the Gaza war. The reasons for the flights were unknown.

Four Typhoons based in Akrotiri struck Houthi targets in Yemen on 12 January 2024.

The RAF reportedly assisted Israel during the April 2024 Iranian strikes on Israeli territory from jets that had taken of from RAF Akrotiri and were flying over Iraq.

During 2024, protesters demonstrated outside the base against the UK and US' use of the base to support Israel in its military actions in Gaza and Lebanon.

In June 2025, Cyprus Police arrested a British-Azeri man on charges of espionage and terrorism among other charges with the man's primary targets being RAF Akrotiri and the Cypriot airbase in Pafos, allegedly for Iran's IRGC.

During the 2026 Israeli–United States strikes on Iran, the station was targeted by a drone attack. On 2 March the airbase suffered additional attacks, as more drones were intercepted, in what seems like an ongoing offensive. Following these attacks, Greece and France sent forces to assist Cyprus in protecting their Flight Information Region and also the base. The UK also expressed the possibility of sending further forces to the region. It was subsequently indicated that British forces on the island would be reinforced, with additional fighter aircraft and with Wildcat helicopters (equipped with anti-drone capable Martlet missiles), in order to better protect British installations from attack. Additionally, the Royal Navy would deploy the air defence destroyer HMS Dragon to the region. Keir Starmer gave the US permission to use Akrotiri and Dhekelia to strike Iranian missile sites. Cypriots protested against the presence of the bases both on moral grounds and because they put Cyprus at risk.

== Controversies ==
=== Radar ===
In 2007, a large over-the-horizon radar antenna was erected within the base. Several demonstrations and protests took place, with the most memorable incident being the act of MP (MEP since 2004) Marios Matsakis chaining himself to the antenna. Matsakis stated "It is outrageous that in the 21st century there are Cypriot villages living under British military rule, neither under their own government's jurisdiction nor under the protection of the EU treaties".

=== United States surveillance flights ===
In 2010, U-2s from the United States Air Force's 9th Reconnaissance Wing were used in Operation Cedar Sweep to fly surveillance over Lebanon, relaying information about Hezbollah militants to Lebanese authorities, and in Operation Highland Warrior to fly surveillance over Turkey and northern Iraq to relay information to Turkish authorities. These flights were the topic of acrimonious leaked diplomatic cables between British officials and the American embassy, with David Miliband saying that "policymakers needed to get control of the military". The British were concerned that the flights over Lebanon were authorised by the Lebanese Ministry of National Defence, rather than the entire cabinet, and that the intelligence so gained could lead to the UK being complicit in the unlawful torture of detainees. After warnings that these issues "could jeopardise future use of British territory", John Rood, a senior Bush administration official, and Mariot Leslie, the Foreign Office's director general for defence and intelligence, became involved. Leslie said that the U.S. was not actually expected to check on detained terrorists, but that future spy missions would require full written applications.

=== Surveillance flights over Gaza ===
Between December 2023 and March 2025, the RAF carried out more than 500 surveillance flights over Gaza using Shadow R1 planes. The crews responsible for flying the planes come from 14 Squadron, which is based at RAF Waddington in Lincolnshire. The MoD said that the flights have been in support of hostage rescue. It has also repeatedly refused to answer questions about what the base is being used for. The UK Ministry of Defence (MoD) contracted a US company to conduct the spy-flights over Gaza from Akrotiri. It said this was due to a shortage of planes. The company conducting the flights is a subsidiary of Sierra Nevada Corporation, a large military contractor. A report by Declassified UK said the US contractor conducted surveillance above the Nuseirat refugee camp in Gaza the night before more than 30 Palestinians were killed in an Israeli bombing raid. Information collected by the spy-flights is shared with Israel. The flights have captured information about Israeli attacks on Gaza but the MoD has not released the information. The family of James Kirby, who was killed by Israel in the World Central Kitchen aid convoy attack, criticised the UK government for refusing to release information gathered about the attack. An RAF spy plane captured footage while flying over Gaza on the day of the attack.

== Based units ==
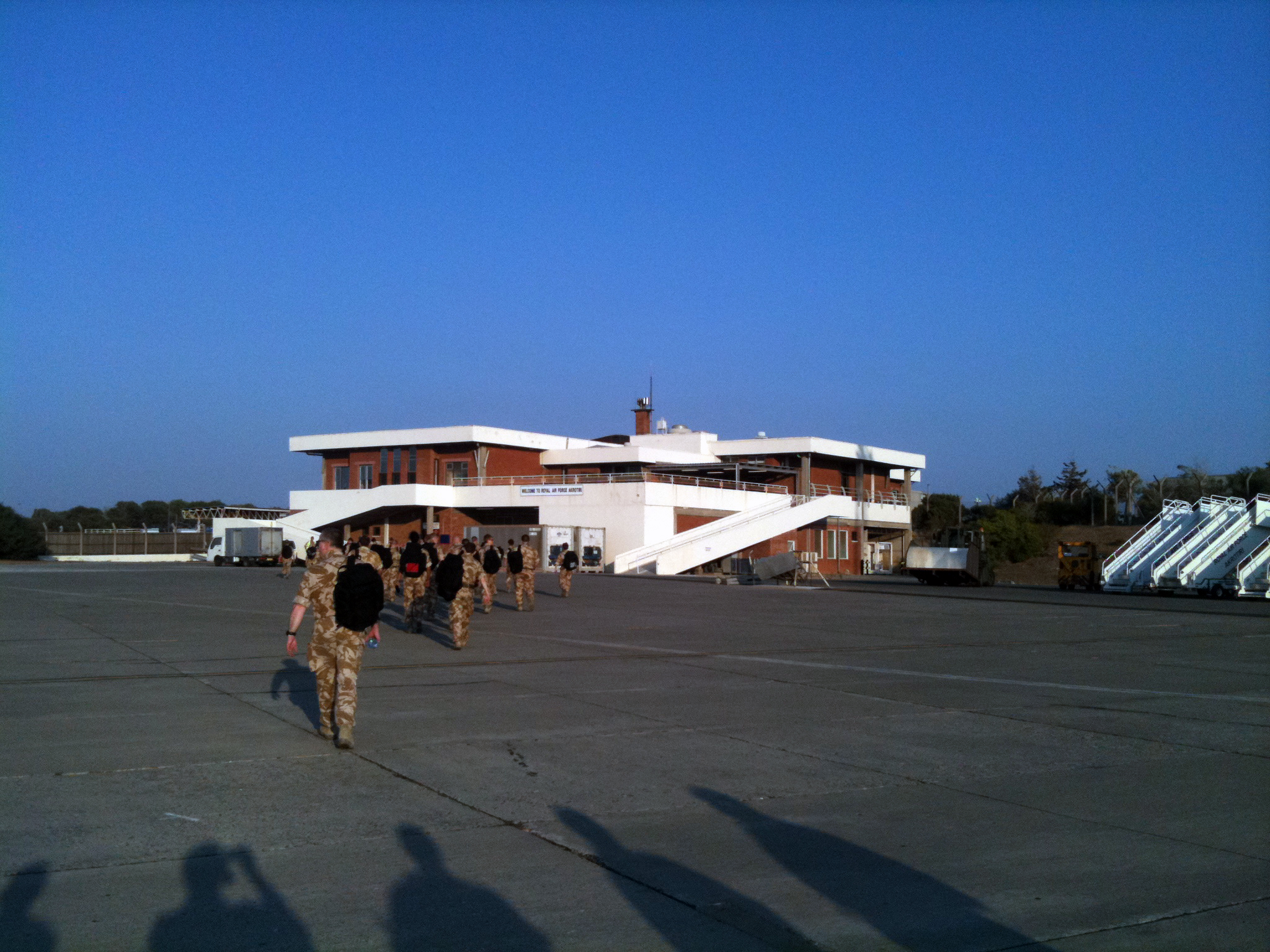
The passenger terminal at RAF Akrotiri.

Units based at RAF Akrotiri.

=== Royal Air Force ===
No. 2 Group (Air Combat Support) RAF

- No. 84 Squadron (converting to Jupiter HC2 helicopter as of 2026)

No. 83 Expeditionary Air Group RAF

- No. 903 Expeditionary Air Wing
  - Operation Shader (anti-ISIL/broader operations/base protection):
    - Detachment of Eurofighter Typhoon FGR4 from RAF Coningsby and RAF Lossiemouth
    - Detachment of RAF/Royal Navy F-35B multirole fighters deployed as of March 2026
    - Royal Navy Fleet Air Arm elements, including Merlin AEW and Wildcat attack helicopters with Martlet multirole missiles deployed as of March 2026
    - RAF Regiment detachment with Martlet missiles; possible deployment of British Army detachment with Sky Sabre surface-to-air missiles
  - Elements of the RAF Air Mobility Force:
    - Airbus A400M Atlas transport aircraft (replaced previously operated Hercules C5 aircraft withdrawn from RAF service in 2023)
    - Voyager KC3 tanker aircraft
  - Elements of the RAF ISTAR Force:
    - Protector UAV UAVs (No. 13 Squadron RAF) deployed at RAF Akrotiri as of October 2025 and RC-135W Rivet Joint (No. 51 Squadron RAF) (aircraft may operate in the theatre from locations other than RAF Akrotiri; at least two Protector UAVs reported at Akrotiri as of March 2026)
    - Shadow R1 aircraft from No. 14 Squadron RAF
  - P-8 Poseidon aircraft from RAF Lossiemouth (deployed in October 2023 in conjunction with the Royal Navy's Littoral Response Group (South) in response to the outbreak of the Gaza war).
  - Elements of the RAF A4 Force
- RAF Akrotiri Volunteer Band

=== Joint service units ===
- Cyprus Operations Support Unit

=== United States Air Force ===
- 9th Reconnaissance Wing
  - 9th Operations Group (Detachment 1) – Lockheed U-2S

== Heritage ==
=== Station badge and motto ===
RAF Akrotiri's badge, awarded in August 1957, features a flamingo standing in a representation of water. The station is adjacent to Limassol Salt Lake which is a breeding ground for migrating flamingoes.

The station's motto is Acra semper acria (Latin for 'The Peninsula is Always Eager').

=== Preserved aircraft ===
RAF Akrotiri's gate guardian is an English Electric Lighting F.6 (serial XS929) wearing No. 56 Squadron markings. Two helicopters are also preserved at the station, a Westland Whirlwind HAR.10 (XD184) and Westland Wessex HC.2 (XR504), both in No. 84 Squadron markings.

== Airlines and destinations ==
Airlines	Destinations
AirTanker	Charter: RAF Brize Norton; Seasonal charter: Birmingham, East Midlands
West Atlantic UK	Charter: Bari, Ta'if, Warton

== See also ==
- Richard Haine
- List of Royal Air Force stations
- United States Air Forces in Europe
- Dreamer's Bay
