= Akrotiri Peninsula (Cyprus) =

Peninsula in Cyprus

Coordinates: 34.61°N 32.97°E

Akrotiri Peninsula is located on the southern coast of Cyprus, near the city of Limassol.

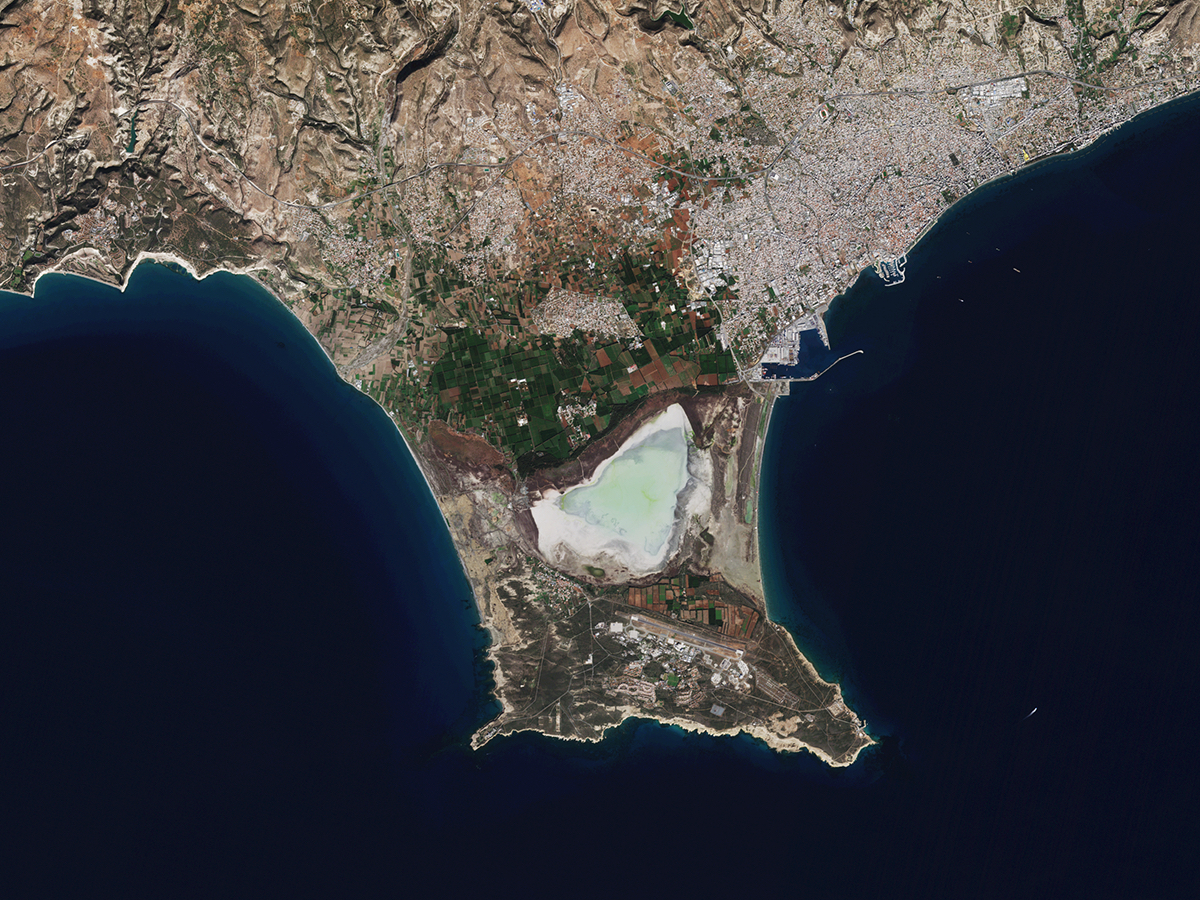
Satellite image of the Akrotiri Peninsula

The Akrotiri Peninsula is a short peninsula which includes the southernmost point of the island of Cyprus. It is bounded by Episkopi Bay to the west and Akrotiri Bay to the east and has two capes to the south-west and south-east, known as Cape Zevgari and Cape Gata.

The most prominent features of the peninsula are the Akrotiri Salt Lake and the aerodrome, which is RAF Akrotiri and Limassol BBC Relay.

In December 2018, a Byzantine church with mosaics including inscriptions in perfect condition dating back to the reign of Emperor Heraclius was discovered during the twelfth excavation season by the Department of Antiquities of Cyprusat the site of Katalymata ton Plakoton, according to an Athens Macedonia News Agency. The Greek Christian inscription described a text "My Lord help those who honor your name".

== Environment ==
The peninsula, including a variety of wetlands, coastal scrub, dunes and the Episkopi cliffs, has been recognised as an Important Bird Area (IBA) by BirdLife International because it supports breeding, wintering or passage migrant populations of several bird species.

The wetlands to the north of the Akrotiri Salt Lake contain evidence for Bronze Age climate change.
