= Cape Gata =

Cape in Cyprus

Coordinates: 34.565°N 33.028°E

Cape Gata is the south-eastern cape of the Akrotiri Peninsula on the southern coast of Cyprus, near the city of Limassol.

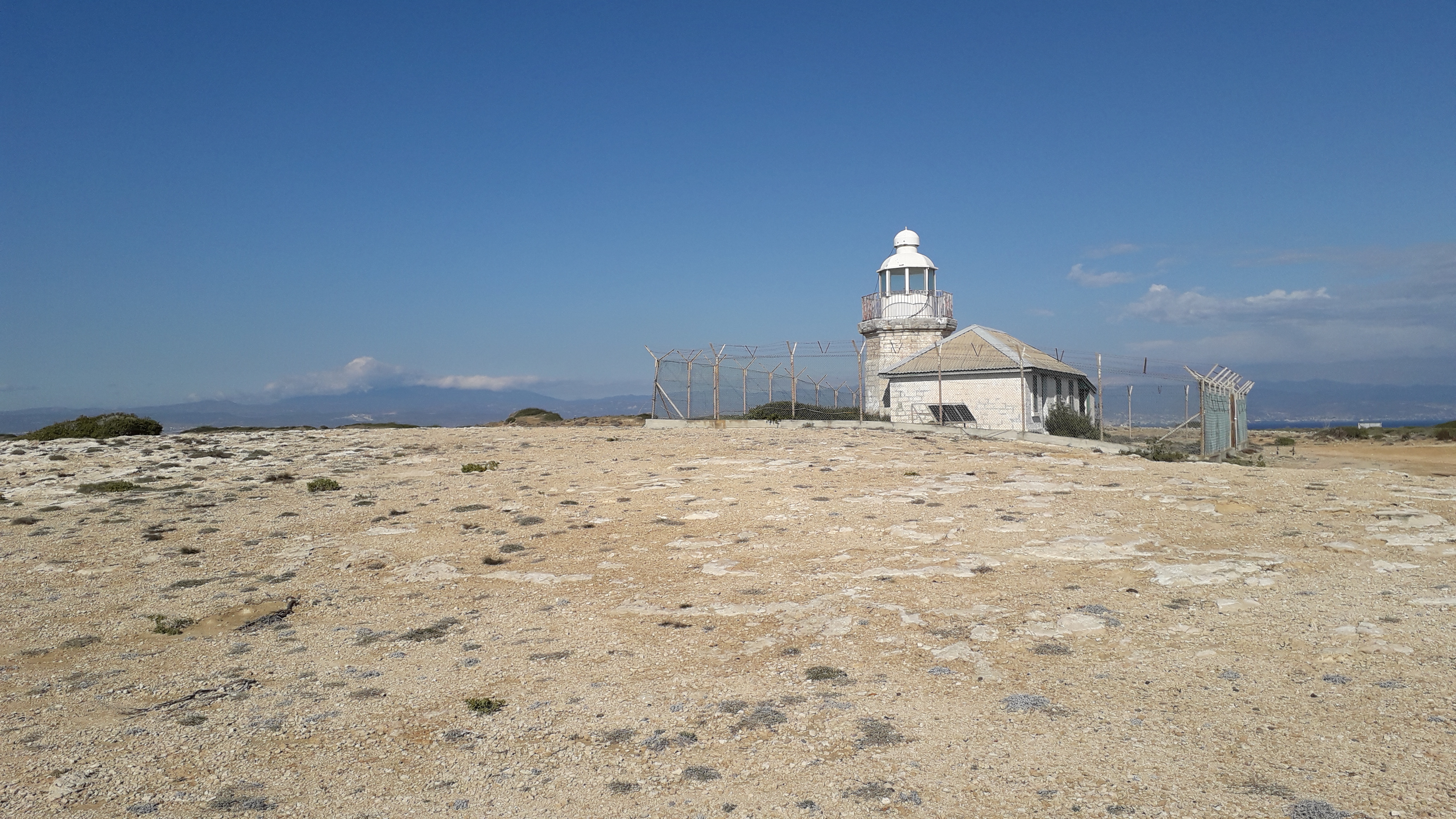
Cape Gata lighthouse

Cape Gata (Greek: Κάβο Γάτα "cat cape", Turkish: Doğan Burnu "falcon cape") is the south-eastern cape of the Akrotiri Peninsula on the Mediterranean island of Cyprus. It is located within the British Sovereign Base Areas, and is the southernmost point of the island. However, the Sovereign Base Areas are not part of the Republic of Cyprus or the European Union, whose southernmost point lies nearby at the border between the two (34° 39’ N).
