= Limassol Salt Lake =

Lake in Akrotiri and Dhekelia

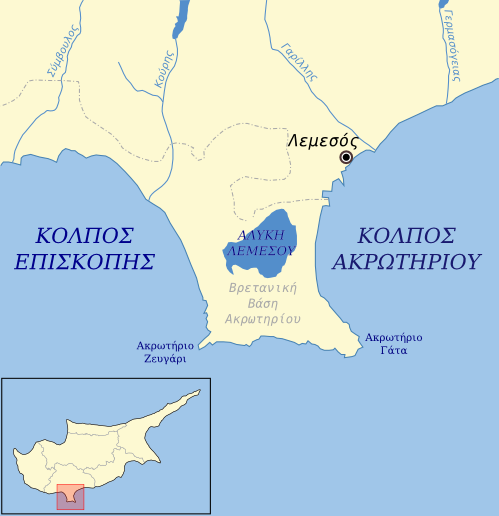

- Location within Cyprus
- Coordinates: 34°37′N 32°58′E
- Basin countries: []
- Surface area: 10.65 km^{2} (4.11 sq mi)
- Max. depth: 1 m (3 ft 3 in)
- Surface elevation: sea level
- Settlements: Limassol

Ramsar Wetland
- Official name: Akrotiri
- Designated: 20 March 2003
- Reference no.: 1375

Limassol Salt Lake (Greek: Αλυκή Λεμεσού, Turkish: Limasol Tuz Gölü; also known as Akrotiri Salt Lake, Greek: Αλυκή Ακρωτηρίου) is the largest inland body of water on the island of Cyprus. It is located in Akrotiri and Dhekelia, administered as a Sovereign Base Area; specifically in the Western Sovereign Base Area.

It lies due south-west of the sprawling city of Limassol and measures 10.65 km^{2} (4.11 sq mi). According to a BirdLife (Cyprus) booklet, its lowest point is 2.7 metres (8 ft 10 in) below sea level, and at its deepest point the water depth measures about one meter. A study mentions that the maximum depth of the salt lake reaches 2.8 m below mean sea level in the winter. A BirdLife International entry for an area including the lake gives the minimum elevation of that area as 0 m. Geologists hypothesize the lake was formed over the gradual joining of an offshore islet off the southern coast of Cyprus.

The lake dries out in the summer.

== Ecology ==
The lake itself is considered to be one of the eastern Mediterranean region’s most important wetlands. The shallowness of the lake (more than half of the lake is less than 30 centimetres (12 in) deep) attracts thousands of wading birds to use it as a stopover during the migration seasons between Africa and Europe. BirdLife International estimates that between 2,000 and 20,000 greater flamingos (Phoenicopterus roseus) spend the winter months on the lake.

== British antennas ==
In 2003 the British Ministry of Defence caused some controversy by constructing two gigantic antennas as part of its radio listening post network in the Middle East.

Local and European environmentalists are concerned that the proximity of the listening posts to this ecosystem could have a significant impact on the wildlife.

== Gallery ==
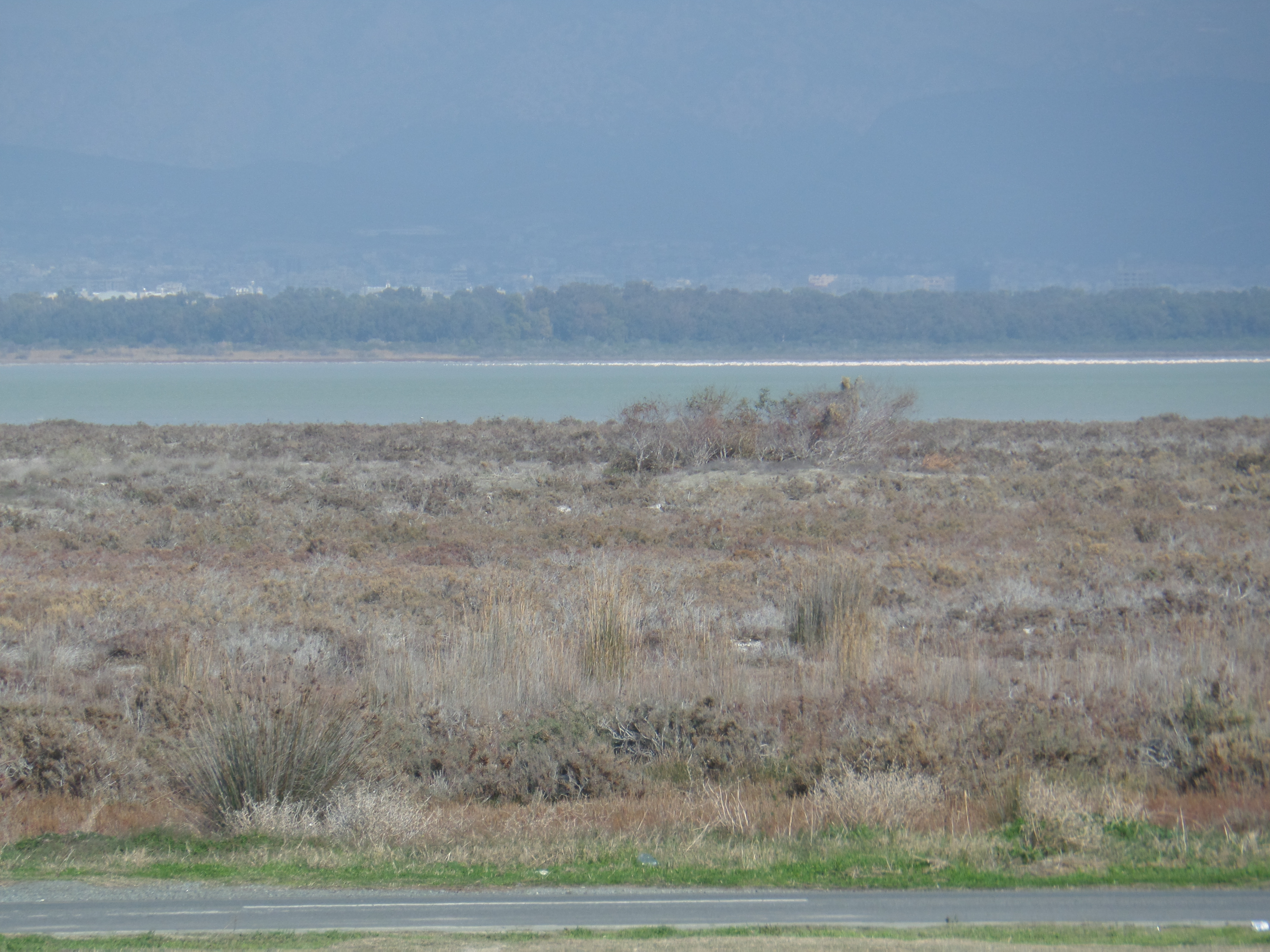

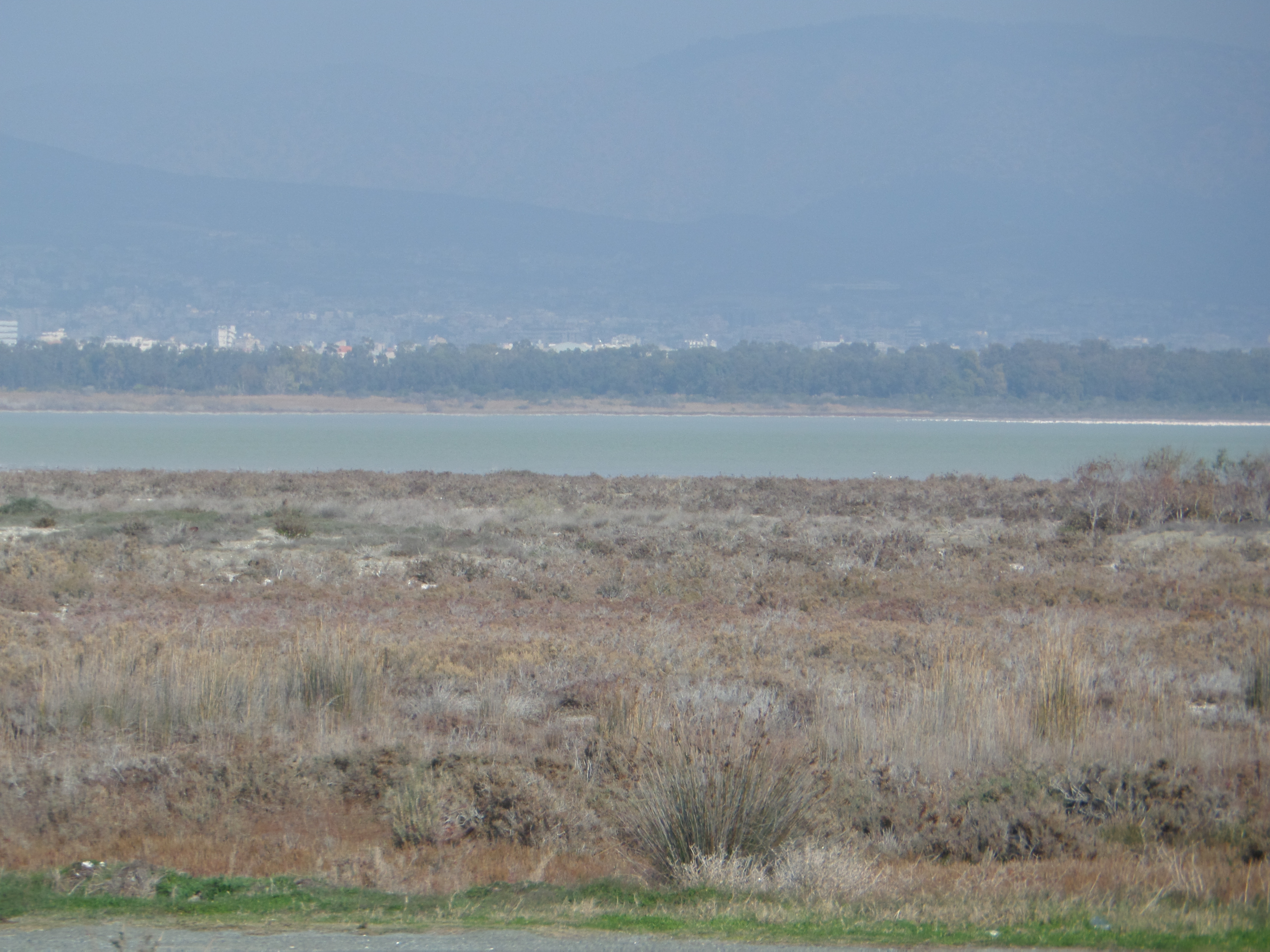

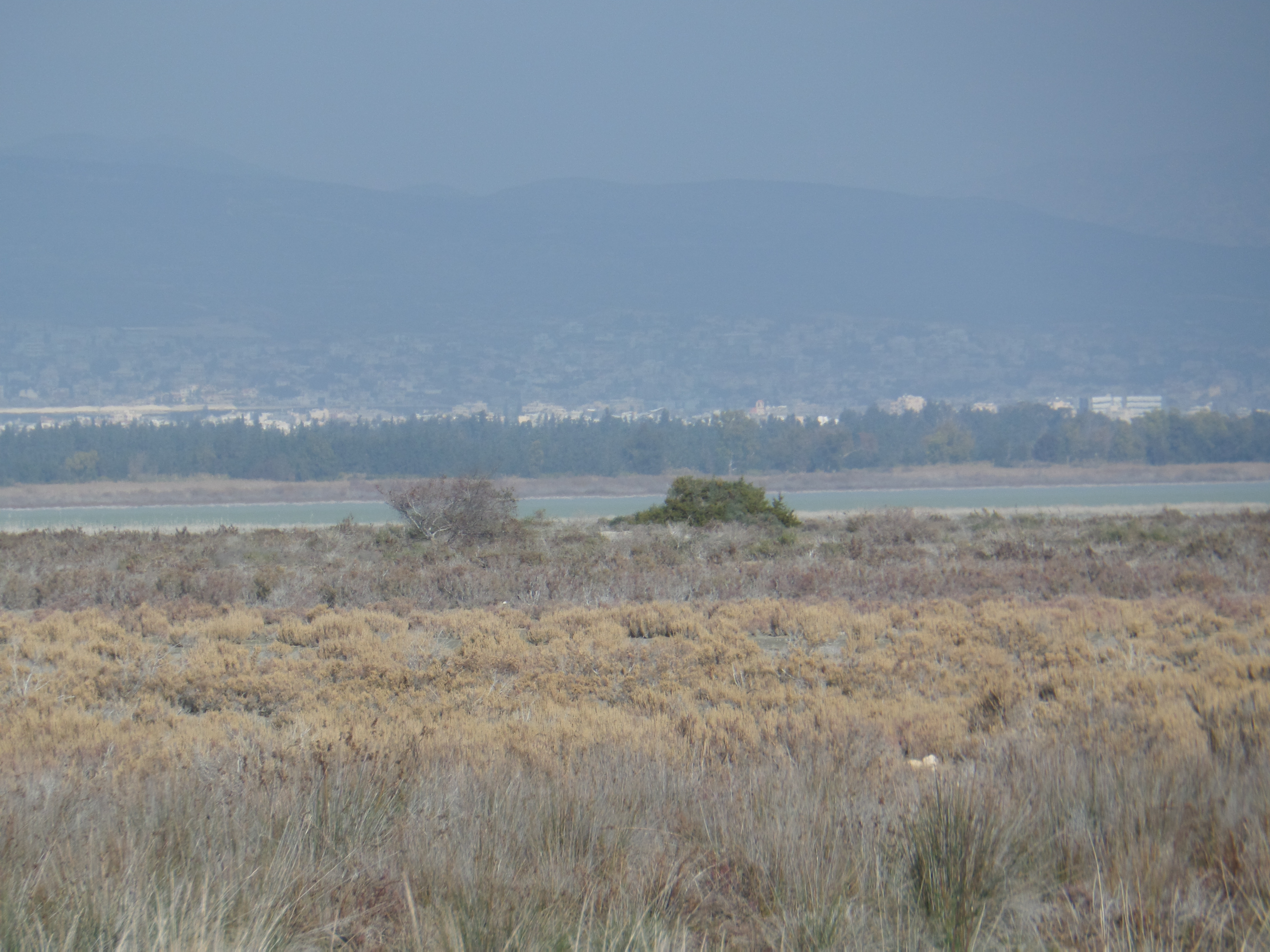

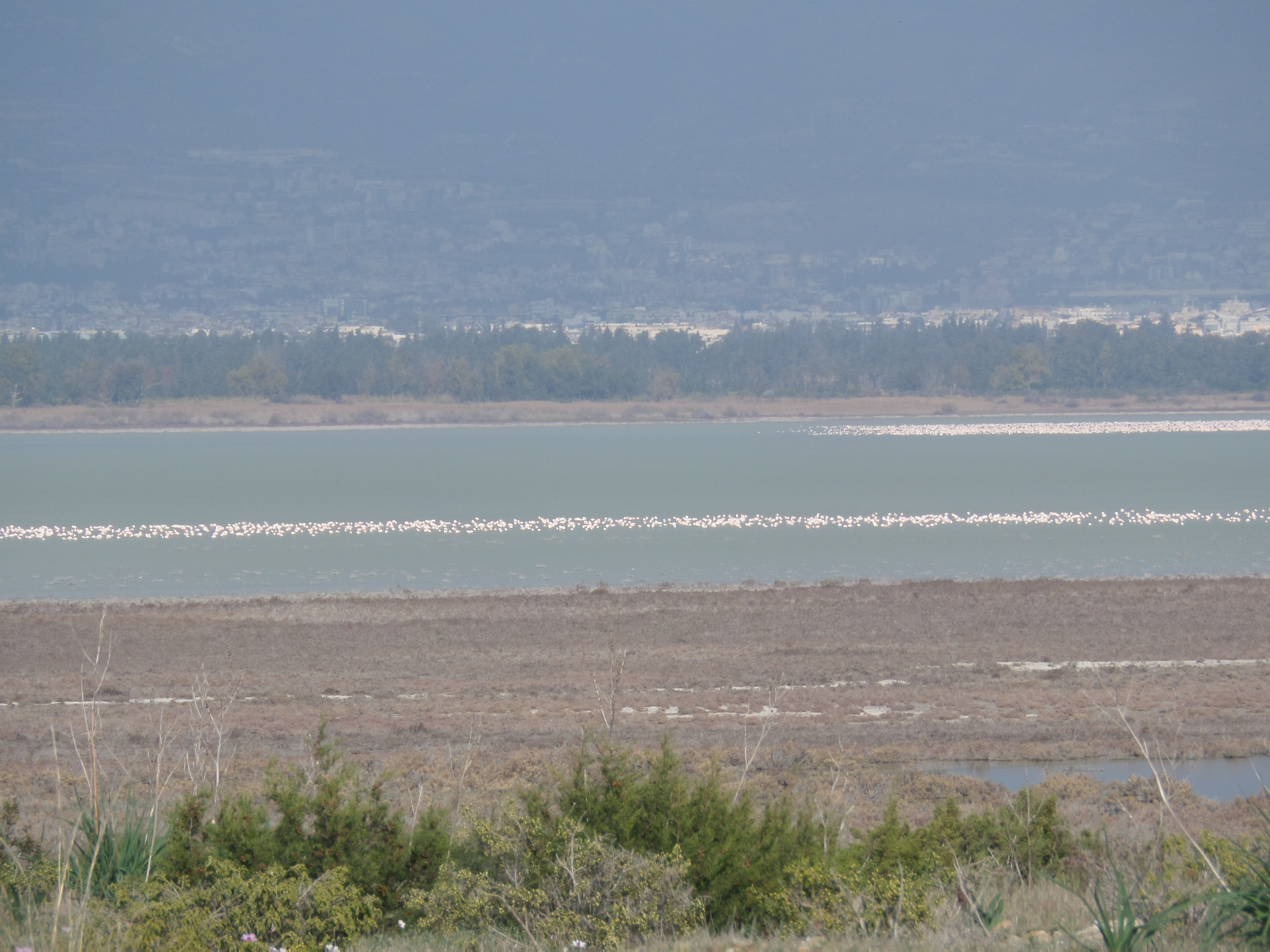

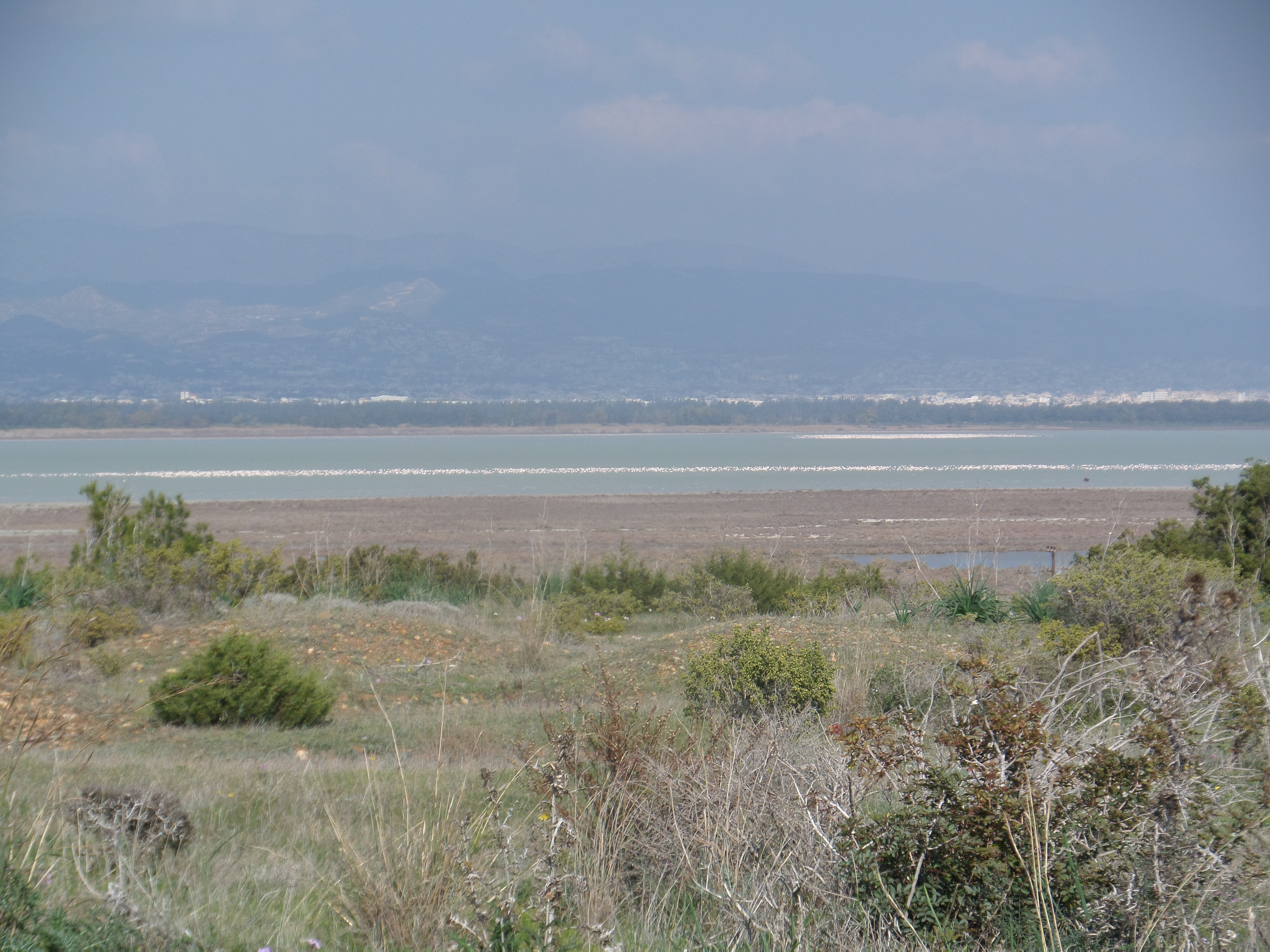

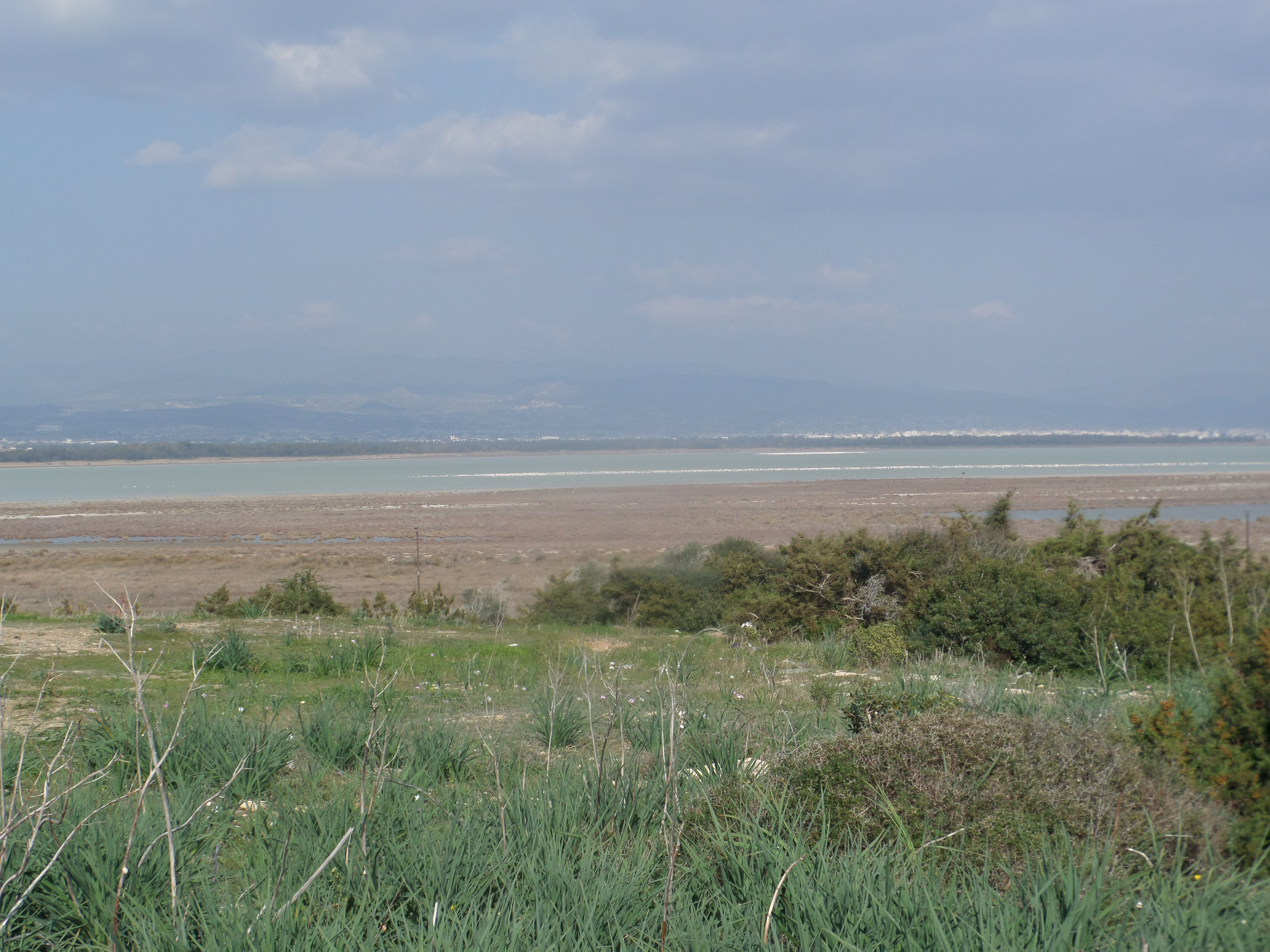

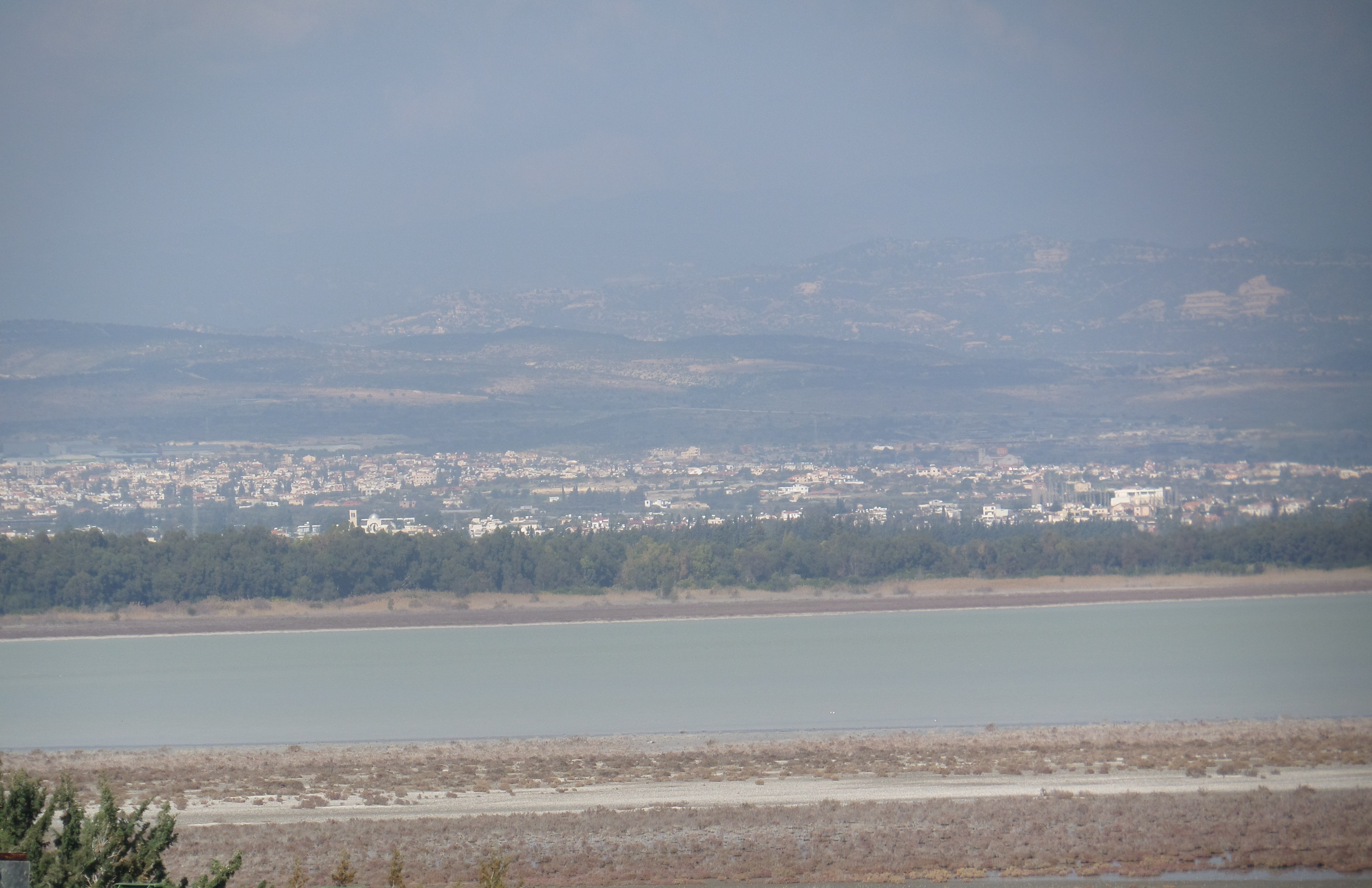

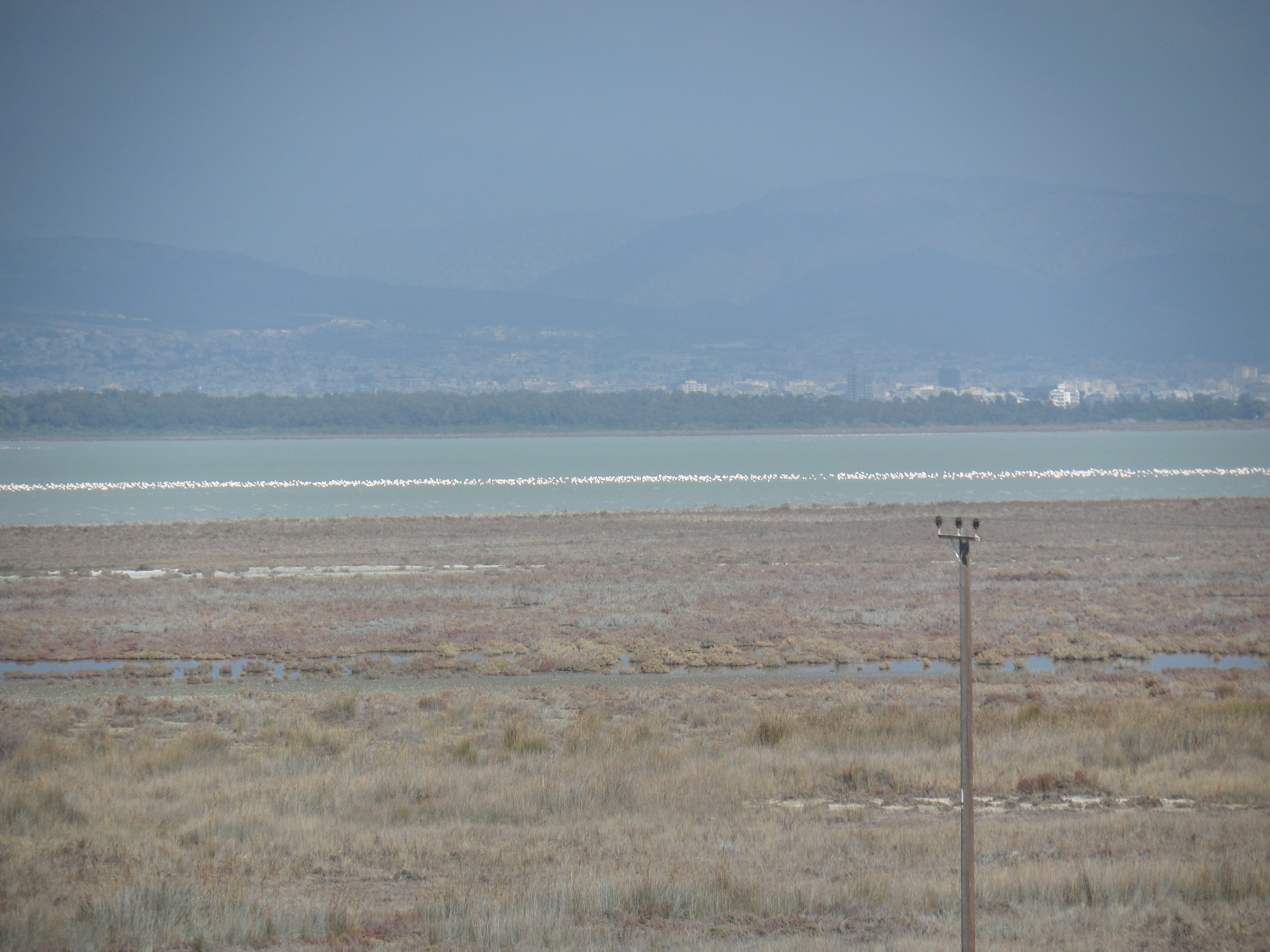

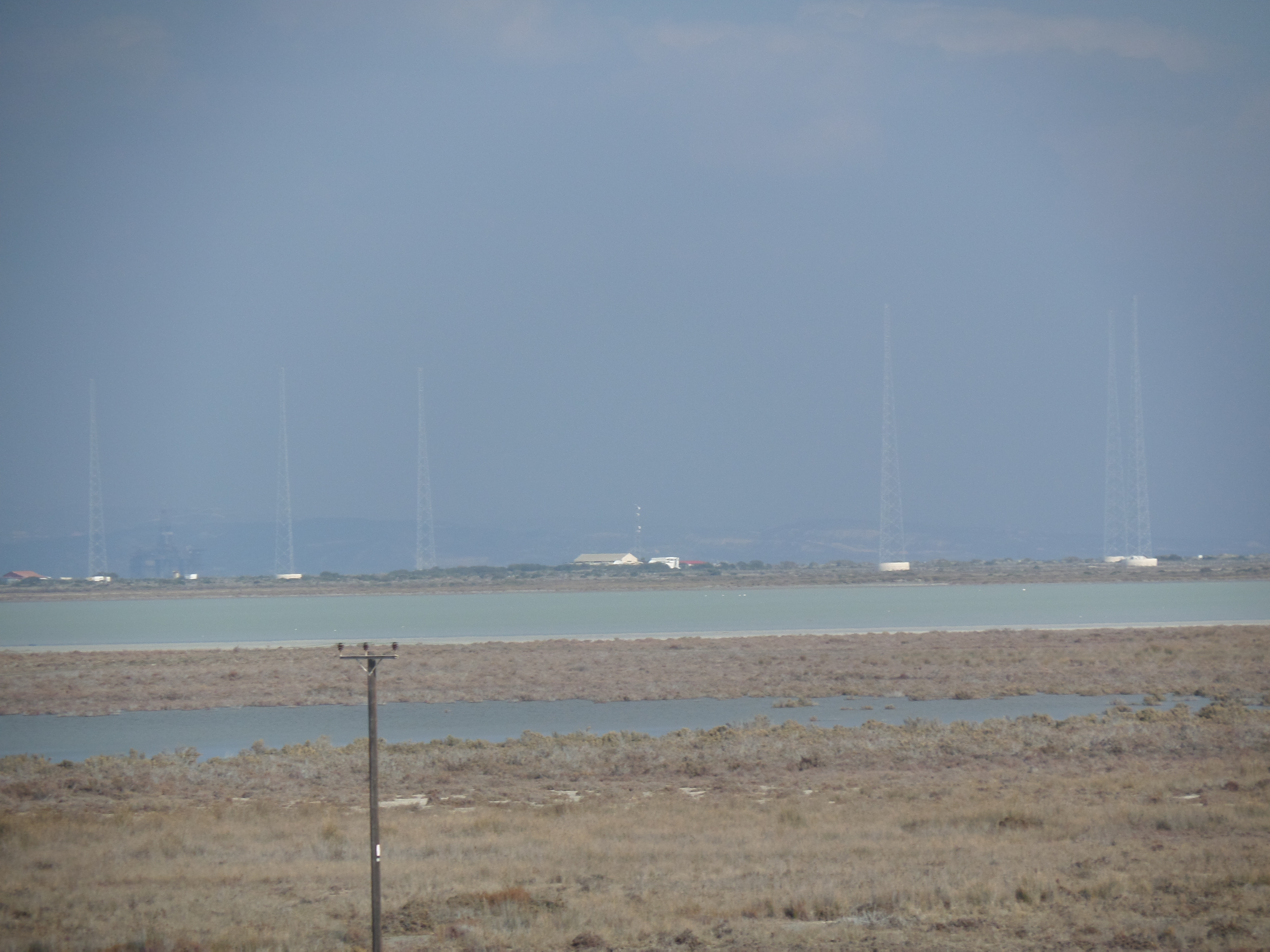

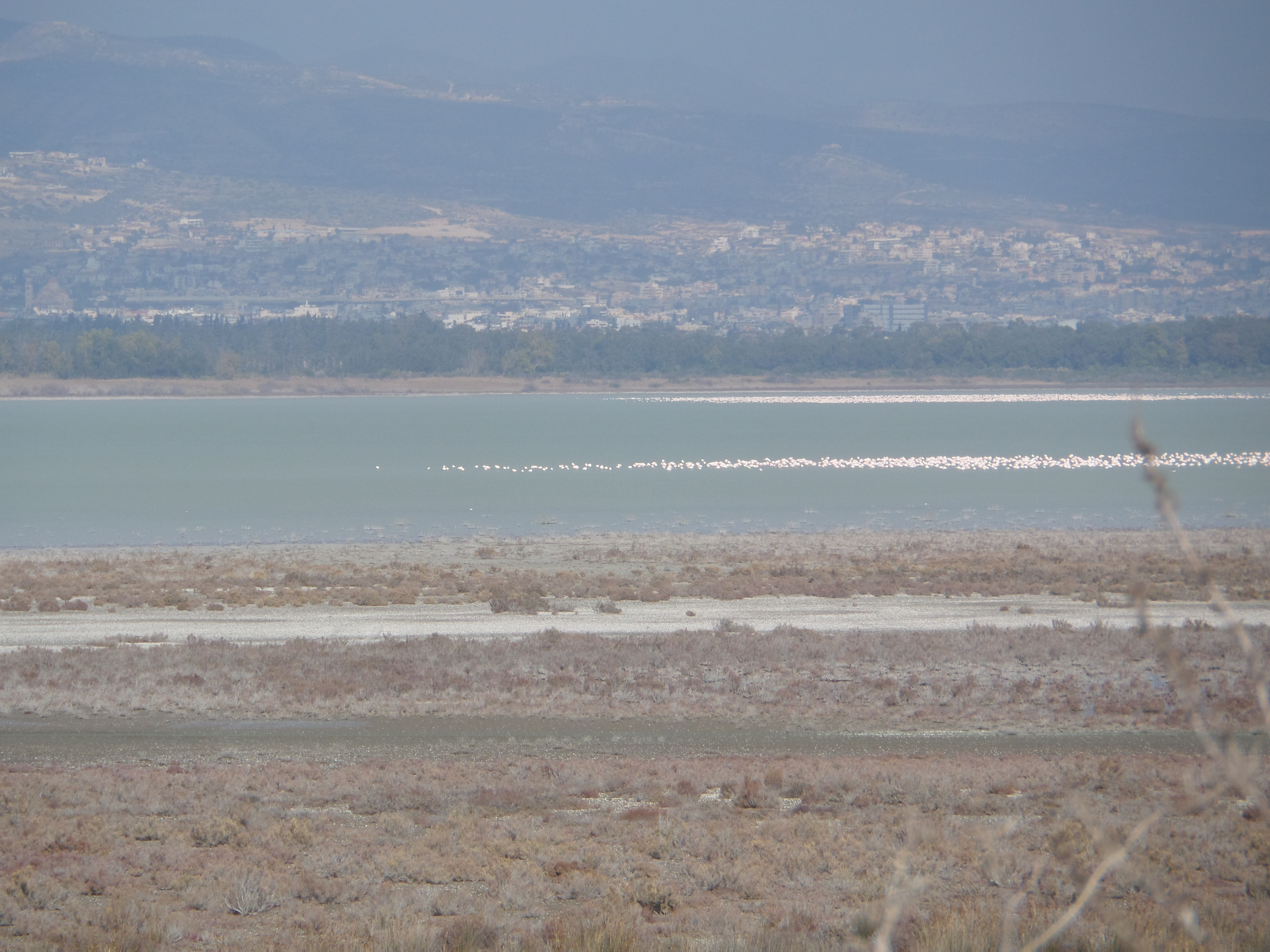

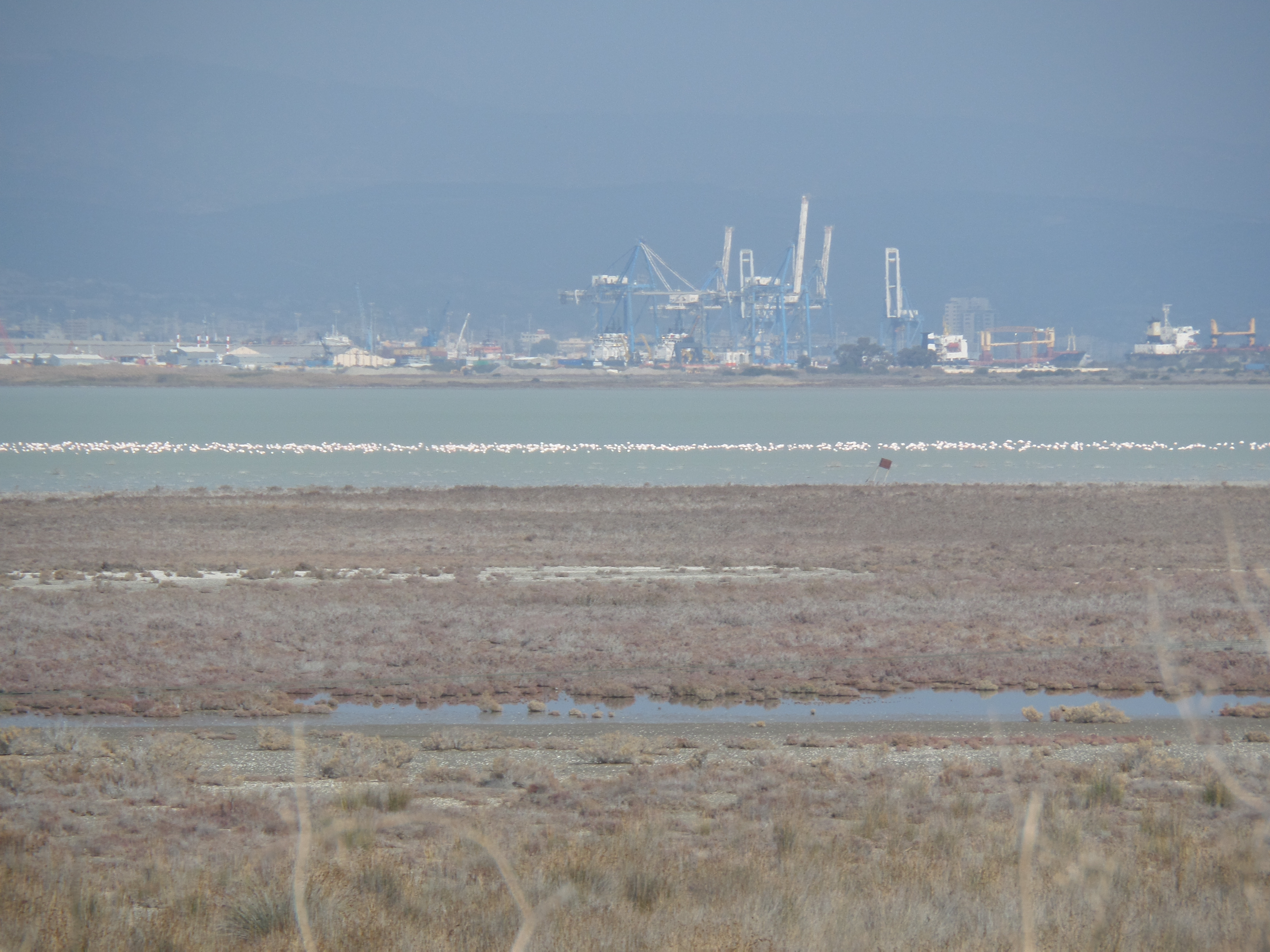

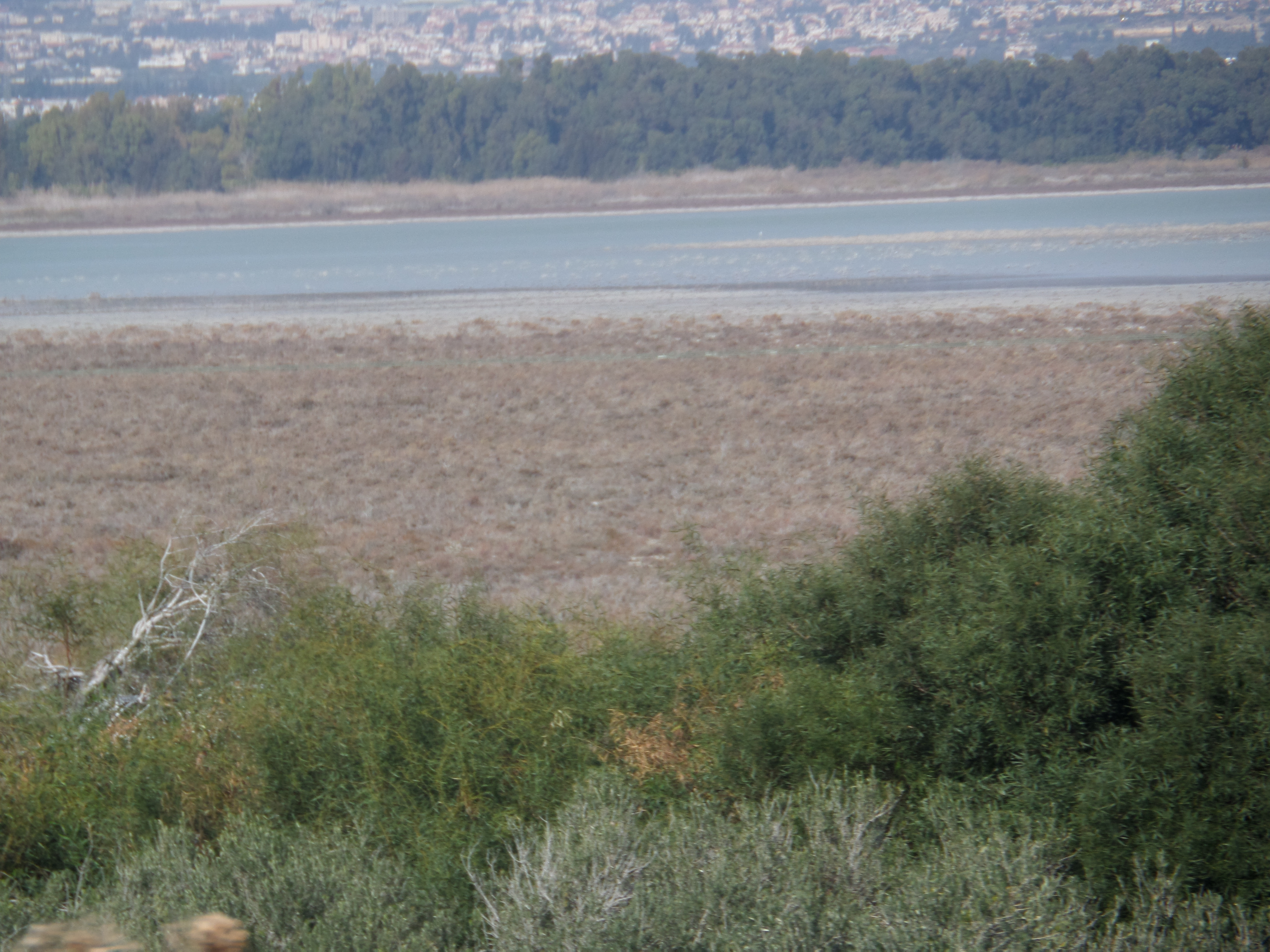

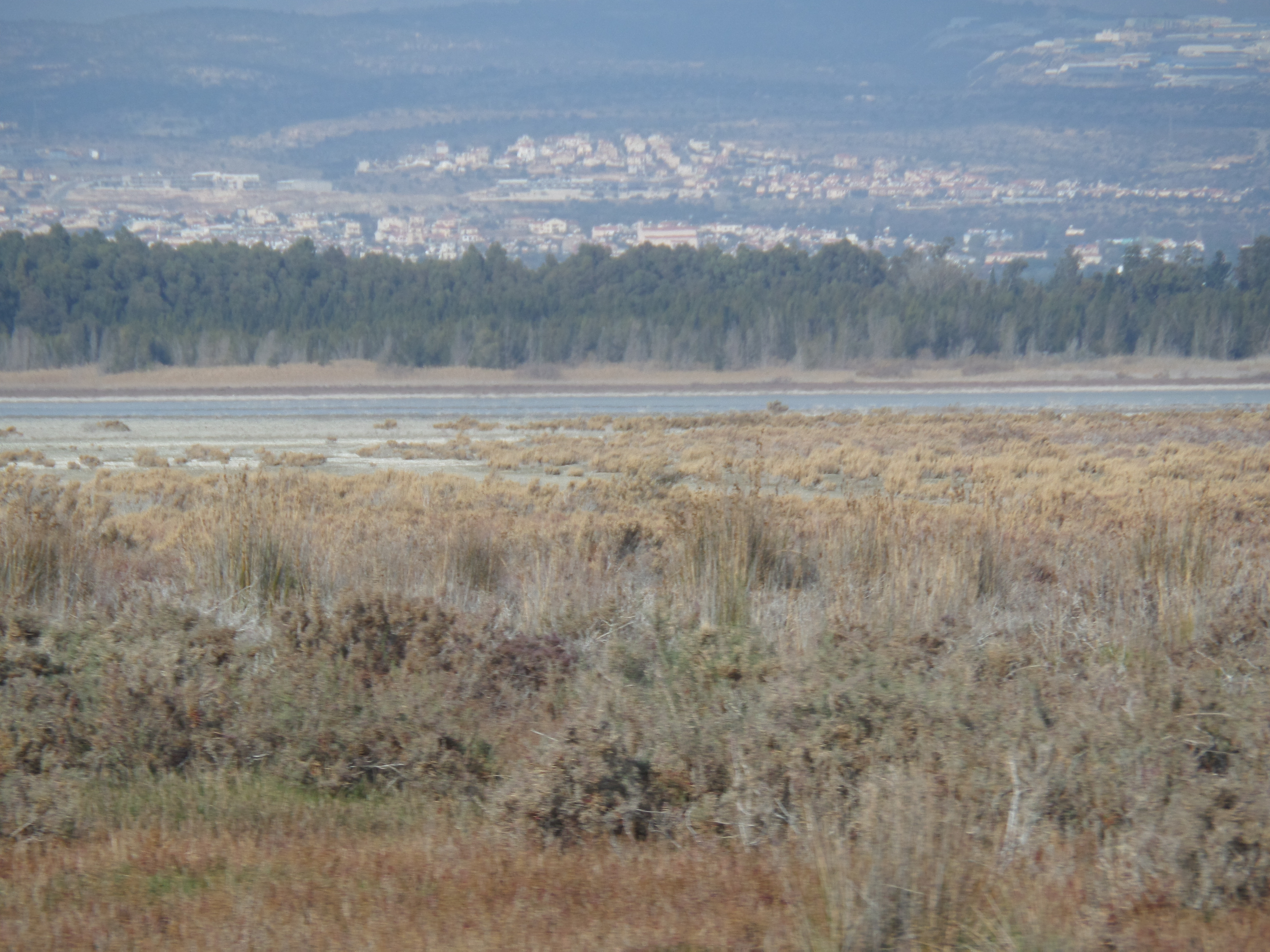
