= John Willis =

John or Jack Willis may refer to:

== Arts and entertainment ==
- John A. Willis (1916–2010), American entertainment historian
- Jack Willis (filmmaker) (1934–2022), American journalist, writer and filmmaker
- John Willis (musician), American guitarist and songwriter
- John Willis (television executive), British television executive, historian and author

== Law and politics ==
- John Walpole Willis (1793–1877), Welsh-born judge in New South Wales
- John Willis (New York politician) (fl. 1846)
- John H. Willis (politician) (fl. 1910s), American politician in Arizona
- John Willis (judge) (1908–1988), British judge
- John T. Willis (politician), American politician in Maryland

== Religion ==
- John Willis (bishop) (1872–1954), English Anglican bishop
- John Willis (priest) (fl. 1930s–1940s), Irish Anglican priest
- John T. Willis (biblical scholar) (1933–2023), American Old Testament scholar

== Sports ==
- John Willis (cricketer) (1886–1963), English cricketer
- John Willis (basketball) (born 1952), American-Israeli basketball player
- Jack Willis (rugby union) (born 1996), English rugby union player

== Others ==
- John Willis (inventor) (c. 1575–1625), British developer of shorthand stenography
- John Christopher Willis (1868–1958), English botanist
- John Harlan Willis (1921–1945), U.S. Navy hospital corpsman
- John Willis (RAF officer) (1937–2008), English Royal Air Force officer
- John Willis (gangster) (born 1971), American mobster linked with the Chinese Mafia

== Other uses ==
- Jock Willis Shipping Line, historic London shipping business
- USS John Willis, Dealey-class destroyer escort in the United States Navy

== See also ==
- Jonathan S. Willis (1830–1903), American minister, farmer and politician
- Jon Willis (born 1981), British fencer
- John Willis Clark (1833–1910), English academic and antiquarian
- John Willis Fleming (1781–1844), English landed proprietor and member of parliament
- John Willis Menard (1838–1893), American federal government employee, poet, newspaper publisher and politician
