= Cyprus Seven Trial =

Cold War espionage affair

The Cyprus Seven Trial (also known as the Cyprus Eight Trial) was a Cold War espionage affair uncovered at one of the military bases in Cyprus during 1983 and 1984. The allegations rested upon several servicemen, although seven were sent to trial at the Old Bailey in London. Two were from the Royal Signals, and five from the Royal Air Force, with all being accused of engaging in homosexual activities and passing state secrets "by the bagful" to the Soviet intelligence network. (Note: At the time, homosexuality was not allowed in the UK Armed Forces.) The treatment of the accused whilst detained before trial was deemed unlawful and after a trial at the Old Bailey in 1985, in which they were acquitted, six of the servicemen were allowed to sue the Ministry of Defence for their mistreatment.

It was the longest spy trial go through the British court system. It was also known as the Mata Hari Cyprus Spy Ring due to the involvement of a female conspirator despite the allegations of homosexuality.

== Background ==
The Ministry of Defence, and other NATO partners, have had listening stations on Cyprus since the 1960s when the Sovereign Base Area of Akrotiri and Dhekelia were established, however, other sites, such as Ayios Nikolaos Station have been in existence since the 1940s. The bases at Cyprus provide valuable SIGINT (signals intelligence) from the Middle-East and the Caucasus region which is fed into the GCHQ system. Cyprus has been called The Spy Capital of the World; its location at the corner of the Middle-East has meant its strategic importance is recognised by all sides. One book written about espionage in the Middle-East describes Cyprus as "bristling with radar and electronic intelligence hardware that made it a major military prize for the superpowers". At the time of the supposed spy-ring, over 4,000 British service personnel were stationed there and the US Air Force regularly undertook reconnaissance missions from the island.

The SIGINT (and to an extent, ELINT [electronic intelligence]) stations on the island of Cyprus were the settings for some show trials throughout the 1970s and 80s. In 1978, the ABC trial was heard at the Old Bailey; this case revolved around a former corporal, John Berry, who had divulged information about the SIGINT activities on the island to investigative journalists, Crispin Aubrey and Duncan Campbell. All three were tried, and the first initials of their surnames became the acronym for the trial. The first trial collapsed when it was revealed that the foreman of the jury was a former SAS officer who had served on Cyprus and at least two other members of the jury had signed the Official Secrets Act (OSA). A second trial was hampered by the government admitting that most of the information that Berry had supplied to the two journalists was now in the public domain and so the offences under Section 1 of the OSA (which accused them of felony and acting against the state, offences with a maximum sentence of 14 years) were invalid. Whilst they were all convicted, none of them received custodial sentences.

The Commander-in-Chief of 9 Signals Regiment was prosecuted for being involved in a smuggling and theft racket with the most senior non-commissioned officer in the same unit. They had traded with, among others, Turkish nationals whom they had been listening in on.

All of the accused, who were from 9 Signals Unit on the base, were taken into custody in February 1984 and questioned. The case against them was built on the belief that they had suffered entrapment at the hands of the Soviets and were blackmailed into passing on secrets to the Russians after attending homosexual orgies. The accused alleged that they were subjected to torture and punishment beatings, including one who claimed that he had been questioned for 96 hours, though the official inquiry into the affair ruled that none of them had been "subjected to torture or inhuman or degrading treatment". Formal charges were laid against seven of the men in April 1984 with an eighth being charged in June 1984.

== Trials ==
In August 1984, a year before the case went to trial, Aircraftsman Paul Davies, who was also serving in Cyprus, was acquitted on charges related to exchanging secrets for sexual favours from a local woman that the press had dubbed Mata Hari. It was alleged that in 1983, he passed classified information to Eva Jaafar, who was a Hungarian born wife of a Lebanese businessman. At the trial, Davies claimed his confession was made under duress and Jaafar testified in his defence despite no guarantees of immunity from prosecution whilst she was in Britain.

The other eight accused from the following year, were all charged

...[that] on a day between 1 November 1983 and 7 February 1984, within the jurisdiction of the Central Criminal Court, for a purpose prejudicial to the safety or interests of the State, communicated to another person information which was calculated to be or might have been or was intended to be directly or indirectly useful to an enemy; Contrary to section 1(1)(c) of the Official Secrets Act 1911.

The trial took 119 days and was presided over by Sir John Stocker. The case was known variously under different names (the Cyprus Eight Case, the Cyprus Spy Trial, the Mata Hari Affair etc.), with, in essence eight men being sent to trial, although only seven went through the whole trial. The case had officially started in late May/early June 1985 and the period at the start of the trial was down to the prosecution of David Hardman only. This was down to the fact that before his interrogation, a medical officer examined Hardman and declared him unfit to be questioned, but the service police still questioned him anyway. The counsel for the prosecution offered no evidence in his case and the judge instructed the jury to acquit him of the charges laid against him, which left the two army signallers, Martin Tuffy and Anthony Glass, along with the five airmen (Geoffrey Jones, Adam Lightowler, Christopher Payne, Wayne Kriehn and Gwynfor Owen) to face trial. (Note: Six of the accused were from 2 Squadron, 9 Signals Regiment, which intercepted the SIGINT messages and the seventh man was an administrator.) All plead not guilty to the charges.

The prosecution opened their case on 10 June 1985 and stated that Senior Aircraftsman Geoffrey Jones was the ringleader who had coerced the others into the spy-ring with blackmail. Police Investigators on the island had only uncovered the spy-ring when Jones, who was due to be posted out of Cyprus, failed to get his clearances in time and so aroused suspicion. Jones had apparently become infatuated with a local singer by the name of Josie.

When questioned about his untimely clearance from the unit, investigators became aware of something of far greater significance. In February 1982, Jones met a Saudi Arabian man named "John" in a nightclub and after a night of drinking, they went back to his flat in Larnaca on the coast. After a night of sex with two other men, John later revealed that he had images of the three men having sex and he used this leverage on Jones to acquire information from him. After the first day of opening statements, the trial was held in camera due to the secret nature of some of the information being revealed in court.

In a similar vein to the Aircraftsman Davis court case a year earlier, the defence called those who they said were the handlers and spies on the receiving side of the information. Josie Igniliano, the Filipino cabaret singer who Jones was supposedly infatuated with and others whom the prosecution alleged were involved in the spy ring testified for the defence in September 1985. Igniliano and another singer, the defendants and in at least one case, a defendant's wife, all strenuously denied that the sexual encounters described by the prosecution ever took place.

After the jury deliberated for seven days, all of the defendants were acquitted, with Jones the last to be discharged on 27 October 1985. The prosecution allegations were that the men had done "incalculable damage" to the United Kingdom, and stating that the spy-ring had given secrets away "by the bagful". The defendants argued that their confessions were coerced, with the judge acknowledging in court that Jones had been questioned by the service police for 55 hours and by Special Branch by 21 hours. Jones had also spent 17 hours over three days writing out his statement. Jones said that his interrogators had told him that;

he could be kept for six hours, six days, six weeks, until he cooperated.

== Aftermath ==
Due to the collapse of the trial and the allegations of mistreatment, the case was raised in the House of Commons, with the Conservative MP Anthony Beaumont-Dark demanding that the MoD pay compensation. The Labour Party's shadow defence minister, Peter Almond, writing in The Washington Times, described the failed court case and the spy allegations as a serious embarrassment for the British Government. (Note: The Conservative party were in government in 1985 and the Labour Party were in opposition.) Denzil Davies, accused the military police of "Gestapo-style methods", while Gerald Kaufman, the Labour Party's Home Affairs spokesman, demanded an explanation to the "pointless and humiliating charade". In the editorial of The times for 29 October 1985, the leading article is in agreement stating;

To lose one Cyprus spy prosecution, of Signalman Davies last year, was to slip. For the Crown to lose a second, even after so many hours of jury deliberation, looks like carelessness or worse.

The UK government ordered an inquiry to be conducted by David Calcutt QC, which became known as the Calcutt Report. The report, which was delivered in May 1986, was quite scathing into the interview methods of the Service Police in Cyprus, but especially of the Royal Air Force Police. The publication of the report led to the Minister of State for the Armed Forces, John Stanley, announcing in Parliament that the seven men were entitled to ex gratia payments for being detained unlawfully. He stated that the arrests themselves were lawful, but the subsequent detention period that followed whilst being interviewed, was not in line with the standards and parameters laid down for arrested persons. The outcome of the case was also raised in the House of Lords where questions were asked about how widespread the Calcutt Report would go given the remit was to investigate the Royal Air Force Police and the Army Special Investigation Branch, but not on the Special Branch, who had taken over the investigation at a later date.

The case was the longest espionage trial held in the UK courts system and cost over £5 million, (Note: The monetary values given represent those at October 1985.) not including payments to those detained, and prompted the Army to overhaul its security procedures on Cyprus.

The trials of 1984 and 1985 cost the commanding officer of 9th Signals Regiment, Lieutenant-Colonel Anthony Boyle, his chance of being Britain's first astronaut. When men under his command were sent to trial at the Old Bailey, he was de-listed from the programme so that he could head up the internal inquiry. The programme was curtailed anyway due to the 1986 Challenger Disaster.
