= Zircon (disambiguation) =

Zircon is a mineral and gemstone.

Zircon may also refer to:

== Science and technology ==
- Zircon (microkernel), the microkernel of the operating system Google Fuchsia
- Cubic zirconia, a synthetic diamond substitute, sometimes mistakenly referred to as "zircon"

== Military ==
- Zircon (satellite), a British signals intelligence satellite
  - Zircon affair, an incident surrounding the British signals intelligence satellite
- USS Zircon, a US Navy vessel
- 3M22 Zircon, Russian hypersonic anti-ship cruise missile

== Other uses ==
- Zircon (composer), American electronic musician Andrew Aversa
- Zircon, a character of the Sailor Moon manga series
- Zircon, multiple fictional characters from the animated children's television show Steven Universe
- Zircon, a character in Land of the Lustrous.
