= Timothie Bright =

English physician, clergyman, and inventor of shorthand (d. 1615)

Timothie Bright, M.D. (1551?–1615) was an English physician and clergyman, the inventor of modern shorthand.

== Early life ==
Bright was born in or about 1551, probably in the neighbourhood of Sheffield. He matriculated as a sizar at Trinity College, Cambridge, 'impubes, æt. 11,' on 21 May 1561, and graduated B.A. in 1567–8. In 1572 he was at Paris, probably pursuing his medical studies, when he narrowly escaped the St. Bartholomew's Day massacre by taking refuge in the house of Francis Walsingham. In his dedication of Animadversions on Scribonius (1584) to Sir Philip Sidney (1584), Bright remarks that he had only seen him once, on that occasion.

== Physician ==
Bright graduated M.B. at Cambridge in 1574, received a licence to practise medicine in the following year, and was created M.D. in 1579. For some years after this, he appears to have lived at Cambridge, but was living at Ipswich in 1584. He was one of those who, on 1 October 1585, witnessed the statutes of Emmanuel College, Cambridge, signed by Sir Walter Mildmay, and delivered to Laurence Chaderton, the first master of the college. The dedication to Peter Osborne (Keeper of the Privy Purse) of his Treatise on Melancholy is dated from 'litle S. Bartlemewes by Smithfield,' 23 May 1586. He occupied the house then appropriated to the physician to St Bartholomew's Hospital. He succeeded Dr Turner in that office about 1586, and must have resigned in 1590, as his successor was elected on 19 September in that year. In the dedication he wrote:

This my slender endeuour I dedicate to your name right worshipfull M. Osbourne, to whom besides I am particularly beholdinge, your good fauouringe of vertue and learning in certaine of my acquaintance of the best marke hath moued me to geue this signification howe readie learning is to honor her fauorers: she hath many daughters, and they be all knit in loue.

== Clergyman and later life ==
Bright afterwards abandoned the medical profession and took holy orders. In 1588 he dedicated his treatise Characterie to Queen Elizabeth, who on 5 July 1591 presented him to the rectory of Methley in Yorkshire, then void by the death of Otho Hunt, and on 30 December 1594 to the rectory of Barwick-in-Elmet, in the same county. He held these livings till his death; the latter seems to have been his usual place of abode; there, at least, he made his will, on 9 August 1615, in which he leaves his body to be buried where God pleases. It was proved at York on 13 November 1615.

He left a widow, whose name was Margaret, and two sons, Timothy Bright, barrister-at-law, of Melton-super-Montem in Yorkshire, and Titus Bright, who graduated M.D. at Peterhouse, Cambridge, in 1611, and practised at Beverley. He had also a daughter Elizabeth.

== Shorthand ==
Eight copies of Bright's Characterie (1588) are known to be in existence, but only four of them complete. One copy formerly belonged to the Shakespearean scholar Francis Douce, and is now preserved in the Bodleian Library. It is a small volume, in good preservation, but the shorthand signs are all written in ink which is faded. Other copies reside at the New York Public Library (defective), the Bayerische Staatsbibliothek, Cambridge University (defective), Salisbury (2 – at least one defective), and the University of London (defective, according to Alston in 1966, but Keynes in 1962 insists it is complete). Another copy traced to John R. Gregg in New York by Keynes is reported lost. In fact, this copy is that at the NYPL.

In the dedication of this book to Queen Elizabeth, the author describes his invention:

Cicero did account it worthie his labour, and no less profitable to the Roman common weale (Most gratious Soueraigne) to inuent a speedie kinde of wryting by Character, as Plutarch reporteth in the life of Cato the younger. This invention was increased afterwards by Seneca; that the number of characters grue to 7000. Whether through iniurie of time, or that men gaue it over for tediousness of learning, nothing remaineth extant of Ciceros invention at this day. Upon consideration of the great vse of such a kinde of writing I haue inuented the like: of fewe Characters, short and easie, euery Character answering a word: My Inuention meere English, without precept or imitation of any. The uses are diuers: Short that a swifte hande may therewith write orations, or publike actions of speach, vttered as becometh the grauitie of such actions, verbatim. Secrete as no kinde of wryting like. And herein (besides other properties) excelling the wryting by letters and Alphabet, in that, Nations of strange languages, may hereby communicate their meaning together in writing, though of sundrie tongues.

Queen Elizabeth, by letters patent dated 26 July 1588, granted to Bright for a period of fifteen years the exclusive privilege of teaching and of printing books, 'in or by Character not before this tyme commonlye knowne and vsed by anye other oure subiects'. An elaborate explanation of Bright's system was given by Edward Pocknell in the magazine Shorthand for May 1884. The system has an alphabetical basis, but the signs for the letters are not readily joined to one another. The alphabet was too clumsy to be regularly applied to the whole of a word, as was done fourteen years later by John Willis, whose scheme, explained in the 'Art of Stenographie' (1602), is the foundation of later systems of shorthand. Among the MSS. (No. 51, art. 57) is a copy of the book of Titus in 'characterie,' written by Bright himself in 1586. A Treatise upon Shorthand, by Timothye Bright, Doctor of Physicke, together with a table of the characters, was sold at the sale of Dawson Turner's manuscripts in 1859. It had formerly belonged to Sir Henry Spelman.

== Works ==
- An Abridgment of John Foxe's "Booke of Acts and Monumentes of the Church", London, 1581, 1589, 4to; dedicated to Sir Francis Walsingham.
- Hygieina, id est De Sanitate tuenda, Medicinæ pars prima, London, 1581, 8vo; dedicated to Lord Burghley.
- Therapeutica; hoc est de Sanitate restituenda, Medicinæ pars altera; also with the title Medicinæ Therapeuticæ pars: De Dyscrasia Corporis Humani, London, 1583, 8vo; dedicated to Lord Burghley. Both parts reprinted at Frankfort, 1688–9, and at Mayence 1647.
- In Physicam Gvlielmi Adolphi Scribonii, post secundam editionem ab autore denuò copiosissimè adauctam, & in iii. Libros distinctam, Animaduersiones, Cambridge, 1584, 8vo; Frankfort, 1593, 8vo; dedication to Sir Philip Sidney, dated from Ipswich.
- A Treatise of Melancholie, Containing the cavses thereof, & reasons of the strange effects it worketh in our minds and bodies: with the phisicke cure, and spirituall consolation for such as haue thereto adioyned an afflicted conscience, London (Thomas Vautrollier), 1586, 8vo; another edition, printed the same year by John Windet. This is said to be the work which suggested Burton's Anatomy of Melancholy.
- Characterie. An Arte of shorte, swifte, and secrete writing by character. Inuented by Timothe Bright, Doctor of Phisicke. Imprinted at London by I. Windet, the Assigne of Tim. Bright, 1588. Cum priuilegio Regiæ maiestatis. Forbidding all others to print the same, 24mo.
- Animadversiones de Traduce, in Goclenius's Ψυχολογία, Marpurg, 1590, 1594, 1597.

His first medical work (dated 1584) is in two parts: 'Hygieina, on preserving health', and 'Therapeutica, on restoring health.' In the part on poisons, where the flesh of the chameleon, that of the newt, and that of the crocodile are treated as three several varieties of poison, each requiring a peculiar remedy. Bright's preface implies that he lectured at Cambridge; he dedicates both parts to William Cecil, 1st Baron Burghley, as chancellor of the university, and speaks as if he knew him and his family, and he praises the learning of Mildred Cooke, Lady Burghley.

His Treatise of Melancholie is as much metaphysical as medical. There is a chapter in which he discusses the question 'how the soule by one simple faculty performeth so many and diverse actions,' and illustrates his argument by a description of the way in which the complicated movements of a watch proceed from 'one right and straight motion'.
