= David Calcutt =

English barrister and public servant

Sir David Calcutt QC
- Born: 2 November 1930
- Died: 11 August 2004 (aged 73)
- Known for: The Calcutt Reports

Sir David Charles Calcutt QC (2 November 1930 – 11 August 2004) was an eminent barrister and public servant, knighted in 1991. He was the Master of Magdalene College, Cambridge from 1985 to 1994. He was also responsible for the creation of the Press Complaints Commission. He is buried in the churchyard of St Beuno's Church at Culbone, Somerset.

== Early life and education ==
Calcutt was born at Marlow, Buckinghamshire, where his father, Henry, a pharmacist, ran a local high-street chemist's shop.

Calcutt was a chorister in the choir of Christ Church Cathedral, Oxford, whilst attending Christ Church Cathedral School, then went on to Cranleigh School. As an undergraduate at the University of Cambridge he was a choral scholar in the Choir of King's College, Cambridge.

== Career ==
Calcutt was known throughout the 1980s and 1990s for preparing reports and inquiries into various areas of public life. He was asked to produce a report on a fire in the Falkland Islands in which eight people died, then soon afterwards to produce a report into the Cyprus Seven spy affair, in which seven servicemen were acquitted of having passed secrets to the Russians.

He is most famous for suggesting the creation of the Press Complaints Commission in 1990, though he was later quite scathing about it, describing it as

a body set up by the industry, dominated by, and operating to a code of practice devised by the industry and which is over-favourable to the industry.

== Personal life ==
In 1969, he married Barbara Walker, a psychiatric worker. She died in 2015. In later life Calcutt developed Parkinson's disease, but he remained "cheerful and genial".

Academic offices
Preceded by Sir Derman Christopherson	Master of Magdalene College, Cambridge; 1985–1994	Succeeded by Sir John Gurdon
