= The Leveller =

British political magazine

- The Leveller, May 1979
- Type: Monthly news magazine
- Format: Magazine
- Owner: The Leveller Collective (dissolved)
- Founded: 1976
- Ceased publication: 1982
- Political alignment: Libertarian, leftist, Marxist, socialist, feminist, anarchist collective
- Headquarters: London, England
- Free online archives: https://archive.org/details/TheLeveller

The Leveller was a British political magazine, collectively produced in London from 1976 to 1983 by a shifting coalition of radicals, socialists, Marxists, feminists, and others of the British left and progressive movements. It was published during the years of the Labour government of James Callaghan and the beginning of the era of the Conservative administration of Margaret Thatcher. This period was also noted for punk rock, Rock Against Racism and the Anti-Nazi League.

The Leveller was involved in a well-recorded contempt of court case in 1979, which concerned identifying Colonel B, an unnamed witness who had previously testified in a case involving British intelligence agencies and whose name the magazine published in its January and March 1978 issues. Convictions under the Official Secrets Act 1911 were quashed on appeal to the House of Lords.

A statement frequently appearing in the magazine, which for most of its life appeared monthly, described it as "An independent monthly socialist magazine produced by the Leveller Collective. Owned by its Supporting Subscribers through the Leveller Magazine Ltd, a society whose AGM controls the magazine."

Members, who met for collective meetings initially in the Euston and Kings Cross areas of north London, and later in Brixton, included: Roger Andersen, Nick Anning, Julia Bard, Imogen Bloor, Dave Clark, Andy Curry, Brian Deer, Tim Gopsill, Cheryl Hicks, Terry Ilott, Phil Kelly, H. O. Nazareth, Mike Prest, Jane Root, Rose Shapiro, Russell Southwood, Dave Taylor, Adam Thompson, John Verner, Ian Walker. Steve Bell, the cartoonist, was a contributor. The logo was designed by Bill Kocher, who lived in the same house as Dave Clark, and was asked to help with the first issue.

A report on an annual general meeting of 21 July 1979, published in the September issue of that year, stated: "Differences within the collective – for which we had hoped to look to the meeting for answers – remained unresolved. The basic difference is over the impact that writing personally about politics should have on the news, political analysis, and so on, that we print. The collective is still discussing it." That year a company, Leveller Magazine (1979) Limited, had been incorporated on 25 May 1979 to operate the magazine.

Initially, the magazine was typeset by Bread 'n Roses Typesetters, who allowed Leveller workers to use their IBM Composers and trained them in typesetting. When The Leveller bought a photosetting machine, Bread 'n Roses arranged to use it, bringing their floppy discs to the premises in Acre Lane, and later in Coldharbour Lane. After the magazine ceased publication, a few of the collective members formed Leveller Graphics, a community printshop offering typesetting and design. During its operational life, Leveller Graphics put some of its income towards paying off the debts of the magazine, including payments to printers and to Bread 'n Roses.

== Editions ==
The Leveller was noted on the British left for an eclectic design and visual style, particularly in its cover stories, representing the values and decisions of an open collective, rather than those of traditionally-designated editors, copy editors and writers and reporters. Cover stories during the magazine's life included:

- Pilot issue (February 1976) "Insurgency and the British State"
- No 1 (November 1976) "The rise of the ultra-right" (price 35p)
- No 2 (December 1976) "Cuts, Capital and the crisis"
- No 3 (January 1977) "Fingering a spook – the CIA in Britain"
- No 4 (March 1977) "The Dirty Books business"
- No 5 (April/May 1977) "NUSS The classroom revolt"
- No 6 (June 1978) "Ex-SAS torturer speaks out"
- No 7 (July/August 1978) "Music for socialism"
- No 8 (October 1977) "The politics of contraception"
- No 12 (February 1978) "Killer watts" (on nuclear power)
- No 19 (October 1978) "The Music Biz – Rock and Sexuality"
- No 20 (November 1978) "Had a Lovely Time in China"
- No 22 (January 1979) "Gays Coming Out"
- No 21 (December 1978) "First World War latest"
- No 23 (February 1979) "The Family – A Pack of Lives"
- No 24 (March 1979) "Crifif, Crifif, Whar fuckin' Crifif" (economy) (price rise to 40p)
- No 25 (April 1979) "Rape"
- No 26 (May 1979) "The People's Choice" (on the general election)
- No 27 (June 1979) "Under New Management" (workers' control)
- No 29 (August 1979) "Spoil Sports... Women in Rock"
- No 30 (September 1979) "Men in Women's Clothes?"
- No 35 (February 1980) "Bringing it all back home" (on Northern Ireland)
- No 38 (May 1980) "At home with nuclear power" (price rise to 45p)
- No 42 (October 1980) "Start-rong – Learnin' kids to conform"
- No 46 (December 1980) "The Ghost of Welfare Past"
- No 51 (March 1981) "Youth Opportunities Programme"
- No 54 (April 1981) "Rebellion in Brixton"
