= Zircon affair =

1986–1987 British scandal

The Zircon affair was an incident in 1986 and 1987 caused by the planned broadcast on the BBC of a television programme about the ultimately cancelled Zircon signals intelligence satellite, as part of the six-part Secret Society series by the journalist Duncan Campbell. It raised many important issues in the British constitution, particularly concerning parliamentary privilege and "gagging orders".

== The Zircon affair ==
=== Development of programme ===
In November 1985 the Scottish investigative journalist Duncan Campbell was commissioned by BBC Scotland to present and research a six part, half-hour documentary series called Secret Society, produced by Brian Barr. GCHQ became aware that a BBC Scotland crew were filming at RAF Menwith Hill, and when Campbell interviewed the former Chief Scientific Adviser to the Ministry of Defence Ronald Mason in August 1986 he mentioned the Zircon Project (regarded as "exceptionally secret").

Campbell had planned to use an episode of Secret Society to reveal the existence of Zircon, but found while researching the programme in mid-1986 that the head of the Public Accounts Committee, Robert Sheldon, knew nothing of the project. The Public Accounts Committee is a select committee of the House of Commons, responsible for overseeing government expenditures. It had been agreed between Parliament and the British government that expensive military projects should be subject to scrutiny by the committee, and Campbell felt that Sheldon's ignorance of the Zircon project was evidence of the violation of this agreement. The concealment of Zircon, which had an estimated cost of £500 million (equivalent to £1.5 billion in 2025), from the committee mirrored the parliamentary secrecy over a previous defence project, the Chevaline programme to enhance the Polaris nuclear missile. The previous head of the Public Accounts Committee, Lord Barnett, had been recently appointed the BBC Vice-Chairman. Barnett had withdrawn from a planned interview with Campbell for the programme after his BBC appointment, upset at the nature of the questioning that Sheldon had faced, who had accused Campbell of setting him up.

=== Intervention by BBC management ===
The Director-General of the BBC, Alasdair Milne, later wrote that the Secretary of the D-Notice Committee made "remonstration noises" after the Secret Society series was announced at the launch of BBC 2's autumn schedule. According to the official history of the D-Notice Committee, the committee's secretary Rear Admiral W. A. Higgins had been prompted solely by the appearance of the series in the BBC's autumn 1986 publicity, and was not himself then aware of the Zircon Project.

A meeting of the BBC governors was held on 13 November 1986, chaired by Marmaduke Hussey. Hussey had been recommended as chairman of the BBC Board of Governors by Conservative government ministers. Opposition to Campbell from governors at the meeting came from Daphne Park, the former MI6 operative, who said that Campbell was a "destroyer" who the BBC should never have employed, and the former diplomat Curtis Keeble. Hussey subsequently expressed the negative views of the governors to Milne after the meeting.

Milne met the Director of the Government Communications Headquarters, Peter Marychurch, on 5 December 1986, on the same day that Alan Protheroe, the Assistant Director-General of the BBC, had written to Milne at his home, saying that the Zircon episode should not be transmitted. Protheroe was responsible for supervising journalism at the BBC, and was the BBC's member on the D-Notice Committee. Protheroe believed that the Zircon episode would damage national security after speaking to the Ministry of Defence.

Initial cuts of all six programmes in the series were then viewed by Milne, who later showed the series to the governors. The governors subsequently felt that, barring a few changes, the series would be suitable for broadcast, except for the Zircon episode. However, not all governors were as opposed to the episode as Protheroe was. The governors held two further meetings before Christmas 1986, at which Milne was "hounded unpleasantly over Secret Society". Milne finally made a decision not to broadcast the Zircon episode during the Christmas holiday.

=== Revelation of issue and government action ===
The Zircon affair was publicly revealed by The Observer on 18 January 1987, with the headline "BBC Gag on £500m Defence secret". An injunction was obtained by the Attorney General on 21 January, restraining Campbell from talking or writing about the contents of the episode. On 22 January, Campbell published an article in the New Statesman against which the government issued an injunction. Campbell's article was sourced to a former employee of GCHQ and four unnamed defence officials, and the Attorney General instructed police from Special Branch to find their identities to establish whether the Official Secrets Act had been breached.

Under the authority of a warrant under section 9 of the Official Secrets Act 1911, Special Branch raided Campbell's London home, those of his researchers Jolyon Jenkins and Patrick Forbes, and the New Statesman's offices. On 31 January 1987, Strathclyde Police conducted a raid of BBC Scotland's premises in Glasgow which lasted for 28 hours. The Controller of BBC Scotland, Pat Chalmers was questioned by Special Branch police, and Protheroe was arrested and questioned by the Strathclyde police.

=== Screening to MPs and others ===
The matter now becoming public knowledge, opposition MP Robin Cook managed to obtain a video of the Zircon documentary and arranged a screening of it to MPs in the House of Commons. The Attorney General, Sir Michael Havers, sought an injunction in the High Court to prevent the video's screening, but the application was dismissed on the basis of parliamentary privilege.

Frustrated, the Attorney General organised a briefing on the matter for the Speaker of the House of Commons, Bernard Weatherill, based on confidentiality stemming from their common membership of the Privy Council. That day, the Speaker ruled that no part of the Palace of Westminster was to be used for the screening of the video, pending a report by the Committee of Privileges.

With the help of sympathetic MPs Campbell tried to privately screen the programme in the House of Commons, though all BBC staff had been ordered to return copies of the programme. The Zircon project fell under the remit of the Defence Select Committee, who wished to see the episode, but were opposed by a civil servant from the Ministry of Defence. The dispute was ruled upon by the Speaker, who ruled that the episode could not be shown on the parliamentary site, it was instead screened nearby. The governors remained in a state of disquiet, with Hussey complaining to Milne that the episode should never have been made. Hussey and the Board of Governors demanded Milne's resignation on 29 January.

However, by this time, copies of the video had been obtained by various civil liberties organisations, which arranged public screenings around the UK. The government was now placed in a difficult situation. The Attorney General stayed his hand and the matter soon faded in the public interest. The Committee of Privileges subsequently recommended that screening the video would fall outside proceedings in parliament and was, therefore, not protected by privilege. They further recommended that the Speaker's actions had been wholly proper.

The offending episode was finally broadcast on the BBC in September 1988. A year later, a New Statesman article by Campbell stated Zircon had been replaced by a US off-the-shelf satellite, under British control, launched by a US Titan 34D on 4 September 1989.

=== Cabinet episode ===
The sixth episode of the Secret Society series was titled Cabinet, and focused on secret Cabinet committees. It was also held back from broadcast, and has not, as of 2013, ever been shown. The broadcast of the Cabinet episode was cancelled due to the imminent 1987 general election. The BBC subsequently rejected Campbell's attempt to buy the episode for broadcast on Channel 4 during that broadcaster's 1991 Banned series of previously censored programmes. Instead the episode was remade using Campbell's scripts. The same scripts also formed the basis for a contemporary New Statesman article on the issue, titled "Power play in Whitehall".

In a parliamentary debate on civil liberties and the Bill of Rights on 15 June 1989, Labour MP Alistair Darling, then in opposition, claimed that the true reason for the Zircon affair was to distract from the Cabinet episode of Secret Society. Darling said that "The Government's actions are oppressive, as has been shown by their treatment of broadcasting. We saw the spectacle of police being sent to raid the BBC headquarters in Glasgow in the middle of the night. ... We saw the Zircon tapes seized as an elaborate blind." Darling said that the cabinet episode concerned "the election campaign of 1983, and the fact that the Government sought to undermine and spy on the citizens of this country. Their object was to prevent the programme from being shown, and the Zircon affair was a blind."

== See also ==
- BBC controversies

== Bibliography ==
- Aldrich, R. J. (2011). GCHQ. London: Harper Press. ISBN 9780007312665.
- Bradley, A. W. (Spring 1987). "Parliamentary privilege and the Zircon affair". Public Law. pp. 1–3.
- Bradley, A. W. (Winter 1987). "Parliamentary privilege, Zircon and national security". Public Law. pp. 488–495.
- Milne, A. (1989). D. G.: Memoirs of a British Broadcaster. ISBN 0-340-49750-5.
