= Crispin Aubrey =

British journalist

John Nicholas Crispin Aubrey (3 January 1946 – 28 September 2012) was a British journalist. He was one of the defendants in the ABC trial in 1978, named after the initials of the defendants' surnames, in which he and freelance journalist Duncan Campbell were convicted under the Official Secrets Act 1911 for receiving classified information from John Berry, a former signals intelligence (SIGINT) operator. The controversy over the case eventually led to amendments to the law in the Official Secrets Act 1989.

== Early life and career ==
Aubrey was born in Chipstead, Surrey. His father was an insurance broker, and his mother was an illustrator. He was educated at Leighton Park School, an independent Quaker school in Reading, and studied English at Christ Church, Oxford. He married Susan Jacob in 1968. They had three daughters.

He worked as a journalist at the Hampshire Chronicle, before moving to Time Out in 1974 as an investigative reporter concentrating on environmental issues. He became involved in an unsuccessful campaign to prevent the government deporting two Americans - former CIA case officer Philip Agee and Time Out journalist Mark Hosenball - on national security grounds after they wrote an article on GCHQ.

== ABC trial ==
In February 1977, Aubrey and freelance journalist Duncan Campbell were arrested as they left the flat where they had been interviewing John Berry, a former member of Signals Intelligence, which is based at GCHQ. They were charged with unlawful disclosure and receipt of classified information, contrary to section 2 of the Official Secrets Act 1911, and charges were later added under section 1 of the Official Secrets Act. During a period of a year while they were awaiting trial, all three suffered intimidation and harassment, including house searches, were followed by plain clothes officers, and were required to report to the police each day.

Their defence was supported by the National Union of Journalists and civil liberties groups. A first trial at the Old Bailey in September 1978 collapsed after one of the members of the jury was identified as a former officer in the Special Air Service. A second trial opened in October 1978. The prosecution admitted that much of the information was in the public domain, and charges under section 1 were dropped. Many witnesses testified under code letters - one, Colonel B, was identified as Colonel Hugh Johnstone, head of Signals Intelligence, and protesters chanted his name outside the court. They were convicted in November 1978 but received non-custodial sentences.

== Later life ==
Aubrey moved to Nether Stowey in Somerset after the trial, where he became a smallholder and freelance journalist. He published a book in 1981, Who's Watching You? Britain's Security Service and the Official Secrets Act. He also became involved in environmental issues. He advocated wind power, editing the magazine of the European Wind Energy Association, and opposed nuclear power. He published two books on environmental issues, Meltdown, the Collapse of the Nuclear Dream (1991), and Thorp: the Whitehall Nightmare (1993). He campaigned against the building of a new nuclear reactor at Hinkley Point C nuclear power station in Somerset. After working as a press officer for the Glastonbury Festival since the 1990s, he was co-editor of a book Glastonbury Festival Tales (2004) with John Shearlaw.

He died of a heart attack in Bridgwater in Somerset.
