= Royal Central School of Speech and Drama =

Public drama school and conservatoire

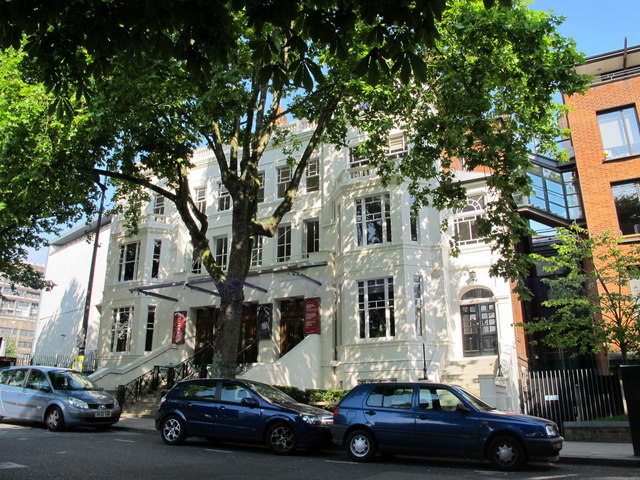
- The Embassy Theatre, home of the school
- Other names: Central, Royal Central, CSSD, RCSSD
- Former names: Central School of Speech Training and Dramatic Art, Central School of Speech and Drama
- Type: Drama school and public university conservatoire
- Established: 1906; 120 years ago 2005: Incorporated into the University of London
- Founder: Elsie Fogerty
- Parent institution: University of London
- Affiliations: Conservatoires UK; Federation of Drama Schools
- Budget: £19.4m (2016/17)
- Chairman: John Willis
- Chancellor: Anne, Princess Royal (University of London)
- President: Sonia Friedman
- Vice-president: Maggie Aderin-Pocock; Anne Mensah; Ben Okri; Jenny Sealey; Zoë Wanamaker
- Vice-Chancellor: Wendy Thomson (University of London)
- Principal: Josette Bushell-Mingo
- Patron: Princess Alexandra
- Students: 1,015 (2024/25)
- Undergraduates: 640 (2024/25)
- Postgraduates: 375 (2024/25)
- Location: Embassy Theatre, Eton Avenue, London, NW3 3HY, England, United Kingdom; 51°32′39″N 0°10′27″W
- Campus: Urban
- Colours: Red
- Website: cssd.ac.uk

The Royal Central School of Speech and Drama, commonly shortened to Central, is a drama school in London, England. It was founded by Elsie Fogerty in 1906 as the Central School of Speech Training and Dramatic Art, to offer a new form of training in speech and drama for young actors and other students. It became a constituent college of the University of London in 2005 and is a member of Conservatoires UK and the Federation of Drama Schools.

== Courses ==
The school offers undergraduate, postgraduate, research degrees and short courses in acting, actor training, applied theatre, theatre crafts and making, design, drama therapy, movement, musical theatre, performance, producing, research, scenography, stage management, teacher training, technical arts, voice and writing.

== History ==
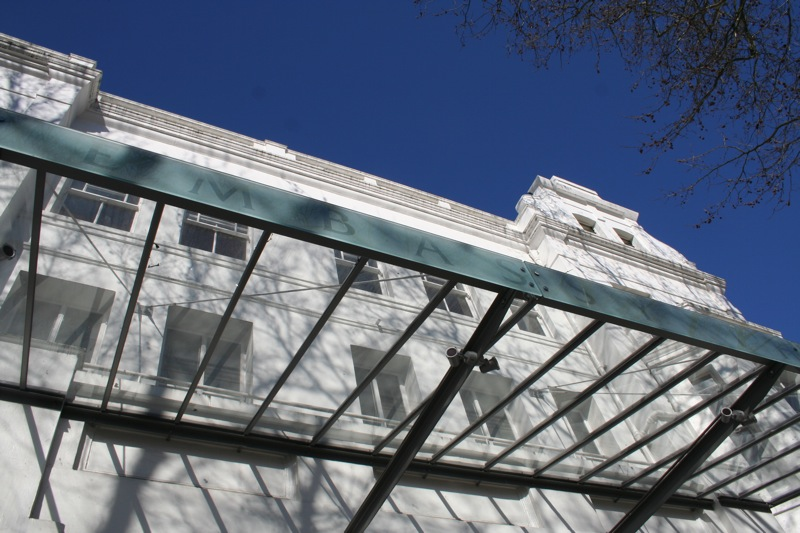
The Embassy Theatre

In 2006, the Webber Douglas Academy of Dramatic Art was absorbed into Central.

On 29 November 2012, the 'Royal' title was bestowed on the school by Queen Elizabeth II in recognition of its reputation as a "world-class institution for exceptional professional training in theatre and performance studies". It is entitled to use it in official documentation, although it continues to be colloquially referred to as "Central". The school's Patron, Princess Alexandra of Kent, played a role in recommending the institution for the title.

== Buildings ==
When founded in 1906, the school was housed in the Royal Albert Hall in South Kensington. In 1957 it moved to Swiss Cottage in north London, an area redeveloped as a "civic and cultural quarter" which includes a new extension building for the school, replacing 1960s accommodation. The school's theatre is located inside the new building, which was awarded a BREEAM rating of "very good".

== Administration ==
Past presidents of the school include Laurence Olivier, Peggy Ashcroft and Judi Dench. In October 2008 Harold Pinter, who attended the school in 1950–51, became its president, succeeding Peter Mandelson. He was to receive an honorary fellowship in December 2008, but had to receive it in absentia because of ill health; he died two weeks later. Michael Grandage was president from 2009 to 2022. Theatre producer and Central graduate Sonia Friedman was appointed after Grandage stepped down from the role.

=== Former presidents ===
- Laurence Olivier (1983 to 1989)
- Peggy Ashcroft (1989 to 1992)
- Judi Dench (1992 to 1997)
- Peter Mandelson (2001 to 2008)
- Harold Pinter (2008)
- Michael Grandage (2009 to 2022)

== Research ==
In the 2008 Research Assessment Exercise the majority of Central's submission was judged "world leading" or "internationally excellent". The school has been ranked sixth in its league of specialist institutions by The Guardian, and ninth for drama and dance.

The school has over 20 doctoral candidates. The first PhD was awarded in 2010.
