= Hugh Johnstone =

Colonel Hugh Anthony Johnstone OBE (1 May 1931 – 30 June 2014) was a British Army officer who ended his career as the administrative head of Signals Intelligence during the 1970s.

== Career ==
Johnstone trained at the Royal Military Academy Sandhurst for two years and on 8 February 1952 was commissioned into the Royal Corps of Signals. He was promoted to lieutenant in 1954, captain in 1958, major in 1965, lieutenant-colonel in 1970, and colonel in 1975. He retired in September 1979.

Johnstone became known when he was identified by the magazines Peace News and The Leveller as the much-publicised anonymous witness Colonel B in the ABC trial in 1978. This led to prosecutions for contempt of court which ultimately failed in the House of Lords. The case became a great embarrassment to the Crown, due to its attempts to disguise the identities of people and well-known defence establishments .

== Personal life ==
In 1954, Johnstone married Daniele Louise Genevieve Alzingre, a daughter of Ambroise Sebastien Alzingre, of Île-de-France, and they had two daughters. He died at Grasse, Alpes-Maritimes, France, on 30 June 2014, aged 83, and his widow died there in 2018. They are buried in the cemetery at Spéracèdes.

== Honours ==
- MBE, 1965 Birthday Honours
- OBE, 1975 New Year Honours

== See also ==
- Government Communications Headquarters (GCHQ)
- Duncan Campbell
