= X-Rated: The Pop Videos They Tried to Ban =

2004 British television documentary

X-Rated: The Pop Videos They Tried to Ban was a 2004 British one-off television documentary examining controversial music videos. It was first broadcast on Channel 4 on Sunday 24 July 2004 as part of the Channel 4 Banned season.

== Videos featured ==
- Duran Duran – "Girls on Film"
- Belouis Some – "Imagination"
- Frankie Goes to Hollywood – "Relax"
- Mötley Crüe – "Girls, Girls, Girls"
- KISS – "Let's Put the X in Sex"
- Warrant – "Cherry Pie"
- 2 Live Crew – "Me So Horny"
- Sir Mix-a-Lot – "Baby Got Back"
- Madonna – "Like a Prayer"
- Madonna – "Justify My Love"
- Britney Spears – "...Baby One More Time"
- t.A.T.u. – "All the Things She Said"
- Christina Aguilera – "Dirrty"
- Britney Spears – "Everytime"
- Nine Inch Nails – "Closer"
- Nine Inch Nails – "Happiness in Slavery"
- Marilyn Manson – "Coma White"
- Marilyn Manson – "The Fight Song"
- Mortiis – "Mental Maelstrom"
- Aphex Twin – "Come to Daddy"
- Unkle – "Rabbit in Your Headlights"
- The Prodigy – "Smack My Bitch Up"
- Tupac Shakur – "How Do U Want It"
- Rockbitch – "Breathe"
- Placebo – "Protège-moi"
- Ultravox – "Visions in Blue"
- The Bloodhound Gang – "The Ballad of Chasey Lain"
