= ABC trial =

1978 United Kingdom criminal trial

R v Aubrey, Berry and Campbell
- Court: Crown Court (specifically sitting at the Central Criminal Court (Old Bailey))
- Full case name: Regina v. Crispin Aubrey, John Berry and Duncan Campbell
- Decided: 14 and 16 November 1978
- Transcript: none

Case history
- Prior action: none

Court membership
- Judges sitting: discharged judge and jury, followed by Mr Justice Mars-Jones and new jury

Case opinions
- Decision by: The new jury

R v Aubrey, Berry and Campbell, better known as the ABC Trial, was a trial conducted in the United Kingdom in the 1970s, of three men for offences under the Official Secrets Act 1911. The men were two libertarian journalists of a similar political viewpoint as much of the Labour government, and a resigned GCHQ source seeking to heighten scrutiny of government-authorised wire-tapping and limit the work of the American espionage agency, the CIA, in Britain. These aims were furthered in the following two decades through detailed parliamentary scrutiny into and regular reports as to the work of security services, a Freedom of Information Act and regulation of wire-tapping. Aside from limited reportage from the Central Criminal Court, early analysis of the case comes in the account of one of its investigative-journalist defendants, Duncan Campbell, in the annual journal Socialist Register.

== Background ==
London magazine Time Out, through the writings of the first and third defendants, published in 1976 a two-page account of GCHQ called "The Eavesdroppers". This and other material collected and imparted by the defendants showed how GCHQ operated from year-to-year; they gathered evidence, such as photographs of radio masts, of its physical apparatus.

By statute, the Attorney General needed to condone the prosecution for it to proceed; he did so.

The case took place from September to November 1978, in an era of surveillance to counter ongoing threats due to the Cold War and from Irish and Northern Irish dissident republicans. Conviction of some form was assured as all parties could not deny a small amount of classified information had been communicated and no tenable argument of the law as to freedom of information such as on the basis of freedom of expression was raised.

The Watergate scandal in the US, exposed by investigative journalists, showed the effectiveness of press reporting of the activities of secret government agencies. President Nixon had repeatedly claimed that the requirements of national security overrode the public's right to know, and this had been exposed by the press, Senate and Congress, to have been driven by his desire to cover up criminal activity.

== Summary ==
All three men were charged with wrongful communication of information under section 2 of the Official Secrets Act. Campbell was also charged with an offence under section 1 of the Act: imparting information which might be useful to an enemy for a purpose prejudicial to the safety or interests of the state. This second charge was dropped before the close of the trial, the judge stating they were "oppressive in the circumstances".

The trial was held in Court 1 of the Central Criminal Court. It was against three defendants:

- Crispin Aubrey, a journalist for Time Out
- John Berry, a former Corporal in signals intelligence (SIGINT)
- Duncan Campbell, an investigative journalist

One of the prosecution witnesses was an anonymous SIGINT (that is, electronic communications) officer, referred to as Colonel B. Campbell's 1979 account identified him as Colonel Johnstone.

The trial found that the information came almost entirely from open publications, some from the United States, as well as simple information gathering such as noting the units resident at a site from signage posted at the main gate and visible from public roads.

The jury confirmed guilt (convicted) as to the remaining (non-dropped) Section 2 offence as to disclosure of those classified matters in no way in the public domain. The only penalty imposed was against Berry and was non-custodial; but criminal records of all three would hamper certain sensitive employment. In 1979 Campbell wrote an article, including the words "It ended in convictions under Section 2 for each of us, but with negligible penalty – in the case of myself and fellow journalist Aubrey, no penalty at all." He added "'Colonel B' rapidly achieved the position of a national figure of ridicule."

In Campbell's view, many editorials mentioning the unnecessarily secretive governance of and occasionally counter-productive application of protected status to essentially all information at and concerning GCHQ largely fuelled the decision by the Liberal Party, successful in the random selection of private member's Bills via Clement Freud, to select a Freedom of Information Bill. The bill, a forerunner of the Freedom of Information Act 2000, lapsed with the end of the Callaghan ministry but achieved a wholly unopposed second Commons reading, reflecting a sea change among members.

The Section 1 charge "lacked the legitimation which could be provided by the existence of a subversive or hostile threat, the presentation of their evidence rapidly became ridiculous. The information [Campbell] had gathered, dealt with piecemeal, was of course readily available in public. As witness after witness conceded this point, the prosecution rapidly lost any sense of purpose." The prosecution dropped this charge.

The contemporary drive of most of the security services with making themselves and their nature top secret, already widely suspected, was criticised in the centrist, libertarian 1979 article by Campbell, citing in support Tony Bunyan's 1976 book The Political Police in Britain, which opined that Official Secrets Acts, as then applied and interpreted in the courts, "represent the last resort in suppressing public knowledge of the workings of the state".

The quickly rubbished first jury, its foreman and others having been in service with the Government, leading to an unchallenged second jury who heard and decided the case, was directly responsible for exposing extreme jury vetting, and eliciting official disclosures on the nature and previous extent of the practice – used generally in the case of political or terrorist trials, or cases of organized crime. Increasing attention by libertarians to the nature of the jury system, and its preservation and strengthening, proved to be a lasting bonus of the case.

== Impact on UK law ==
Aubrey and Campbell had predominantly worked by cross-referencing public sources of information such as open army journals. The case challenged the presumption by UK security services that arbitrary material related to military or security operations could be inherently considered secret, or that synthesising such material could be considered espionage. One exchange in court resulted in a witness claiming that the sign outside their base was a secret, despite being visible from a public road. Key witness Col. Johnston admitted under cross-examination that "To be frank, I am not certain what is a secret and what isn't."

The Official Secrets Act 1911 was largely replaced by the Official Secrets Act 1989, including the "catch-all" Section 2 that Aubrey, Berry and Campbell had been convicted under. Inclusion of a specific public interest defence was considered for the 1989 Act, but rejected as it was deemed that protections under Article 10 (Freedom of Expression) of the European Convention of Human Rights and other legal safeguards provided sufficient protection. Future governments have generally refrained from authorising prosecutions against journalists under the OSA, treating leaks as an internal problem and not one which should impinge upon freedom of the press.

== Timeline ==
- 18 February 1977: Aubrey and Campbell (the two journalists) interview Berry
- 20 February 1977: All three men arrested and charged under Section 2 of the Official Secrets Act 1911 (Berry was charged with "communicating classified information to unauthorised persons", and Campbell and Aubrey with "unauthorised receipt of classified information")
- 24 May 1977: Further charges added under Section 1 of the Official Secrets Act
- 9 August 1977: Additional charge under Section 1 against Duncan Campbell, for collecting information
- November 1977: Committal hearing at Tottenham Magistrates Court. First appearance of Colonel B as a prosecution witness.
- 5 September 1978: Trial opens at the Old Bailey before Mr Justice Willis
- 18 September 1978: Trial stopped after jury foreman is exposed as a former SAS officer
- 3 October 1978: Second trial opens before Mr Justice Mars-Jones
- 24 October 1978: All Section 1 charges dropped
- 14 November 1978: Aubrey and Berry convicted by the jury
- 16 November 1978: Campbell convicted by the jury
- 17 November 1978: The only penalty imposed is non-custodial, against Berry.

== Defendant's opinion of Attorney General ==
In 1979, Campbell wrote that the Attorney General "had allowed himself to be used as a patsy for the security services to try to rearrange the law of official secrecy to their choosing. Several initiatives from that quarter had become apparent during the case."
