= Standing Committee on Pressure Groups =

The Standing Committee on Pressure Groups (SCOPG) was a secret committee set up in 1977 by the Hong Kong government to monitor the activities of pressure groups. The existence of this committee was first revealed in the New Statesman on 12 December 1980. The article, written by Duncan Campbell, asserted that any political group had been subjected to surveillance. Furthermore, the SCOPG had actively sought to undermine, co-opt or coerce eleven groups that were specifically targeted in a confidential report obtained by the paper. What was even more surprising, the SCOPG had been set up to infiltrate pressure groups. The greatest emphasis was placed on a group called the Hong Kong Observers. Due to political pressure the committee ceased to exist in 1983.

== Government response ==
The government officially recognized the existence of the committee but denied that it had any sinister motives. The claim was that it was set up to monitor pressure groups in order to better understand the groups' opinions. Furthermore, the government attacked the New Statesman for inaccuracies and lies (such as the allegation that the committee had sought to infiltrate pressure groups). The report had also put pressure on the government to reveal details about the Special Branch, which Campbell had put at 20% of the police force. The government rejected these figures and also asserted that the staff of 1,200 was used to accommodate state visits, avert terrorist acts, and subversive activities by Kuomintang agents.

== Later revelations ==
The Hong Kong Standard revealed on 16 January 1981 that there were personal attacks as well as plans for possible infiltration of groups such as school and college associations. The paper reported that the goal of the SCOPG was to protect Hong Kong's image abroad. On 28 January 1981 the same paper reported on a 'Red List' after it had obtained 11 further confidential reports. The three groups that were supposedly threatened by Communist infiltration were the Hong Kong Professional Teachers' Union (HKPTU)(headed by Szeto Wah), the Hong Kong Federation of Students (HKFS) and the Government School Non-Graduate Teachers Union (GSNTU). In response to this revelation, the government said that this report did not reflect the official opinion of the government.

== Destruction of the files ==
In 1995, the government admitted that almost all the files related to the SCOPG report had been destroyed during the 1980s "for record management purposes." The secretary for security, Peter Lai, also stated: "Government policy provides for the review of classified material. Government files are destroyed for record management purposes when they no longer serve a useful purpose." The government refused to answer further questions about the committee and declared that no new similar committee had been set up.
