= Ayios Nikolaos Station =

British military station in Cyprus

- Άγιος Νικόλαος
- Dhekelia Cantonment in Sovereign Base Areas of Akrotiri and Dhekelia, Cyprus
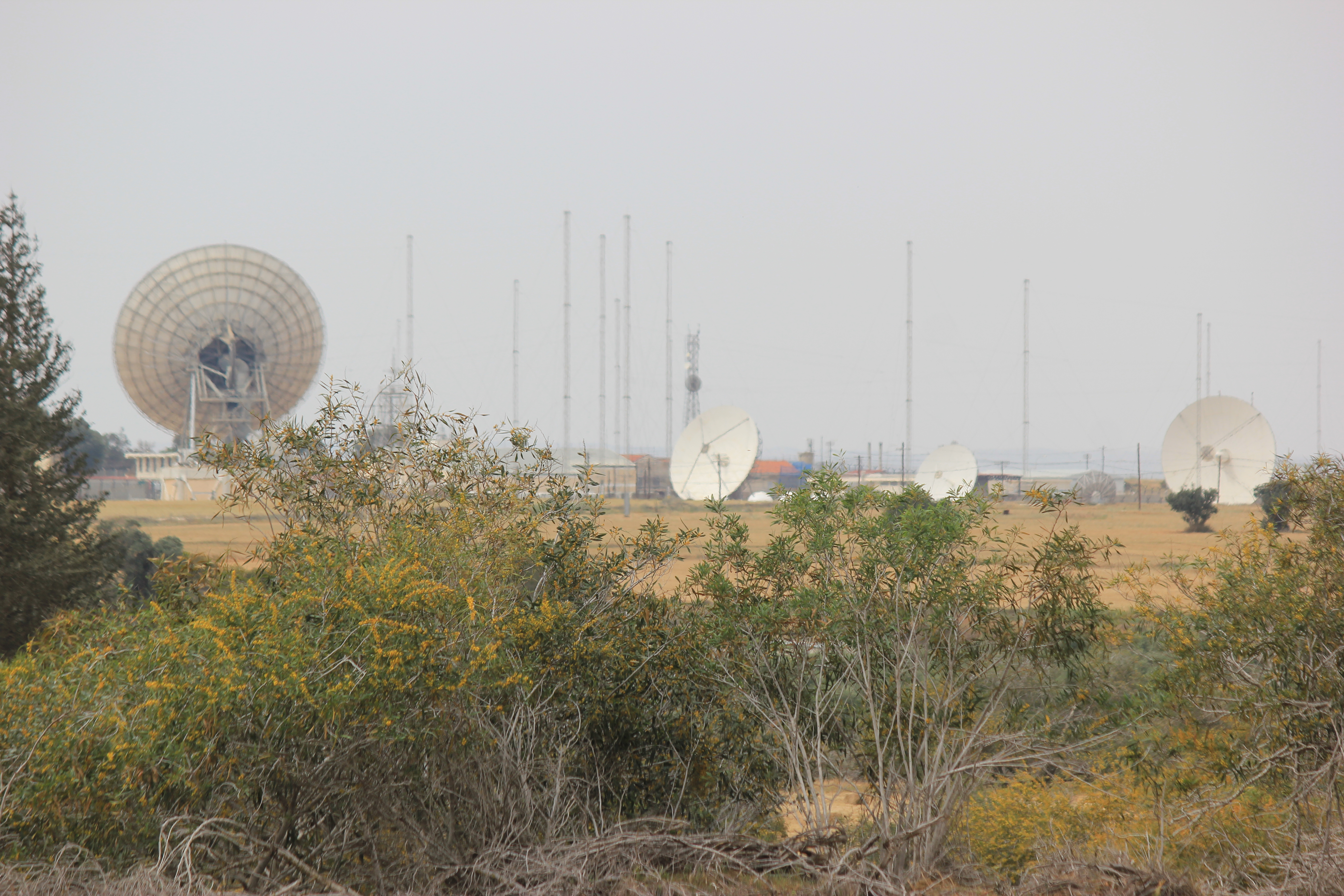
- Satellite and other communications antennas at Ayios Nikolaos Station

Site information
- Type: Signals intelligence gathering station
- Owner: Ministry of Defence
- Operator: Strategic Command
- Controlled by: British Forces Cyprus
- Condition: Operational
- Website: Ayios Nikolaos Station at GOV.UK

Location
- Location in Cyprus
- Coordinates: 35°05′35″N 33°53′12″E

Site history
- Built: c. 1946
- In use: 1946 – present
- Events: Cyprus Seven Trial (1985)

Garrison information
- Garrison: Joint Service Signal Unit, Cyprus

Ayios Nikolaos Station (also spelled Agios Nikolaos; Greek: Άγιος Νικόλαος, lit. "Saint Nicholas") is a British military station and part of the British Sovereign Base Area of Dhekelia in Cyprus. It is a former village (Ayios Nikolaos, SBA) connected by a road to the main area of the Dhekelia Garrison. The Joint Service Signal Unit (Cyprus) (JSSU(Cyp)), formerly 9th Signal Regiment and the Royal Air Force's 33 Signals Unit, is based at Ayios Nikolaos. This unit is a British Armed Forces run electronic intelligence gathering station.

The current superior body to JSSU (Cyp) appears to be the Joint Service Signal Organisation. The JSSO, as of 2012, was located at RAF Digby in Lincolnshire, under the command of a Group Captain of the RAF Operations Support Branch and had 1,600 staff which are drawn from all three services.

== History ==
The station was established at Ayios Nikolaos shortly after the Second World War. In 1946 2 Wireless Company and 2 Special Wireless Group merged to become 2 Wireless Regiment RSigs. In 1959 2 Wireless Regiment became 9 Signal Regiment.

In early 1956 No. 751 Signals Unit RAF, a mobile radar convoy, was located at RAF Ayios Nikolaos. The unit radars initially comprised one Type 15, two Type 14s, and two Type 13s, conducting air defence. It moved to Cape Greco after March 1956. It was located there until 1959.

There were a number of court cases involving servicemen from the regiment during the 1980s, including the Cyprus Seven Trial, an alleged spy-ring operating at Ayios Nikolaos Station in 1984.

The Joint Service Signal Unit (Cyprus) (or JSSU (Cyp)) was formed on 1 April 1999, as a result of the amalgamation of the Joint Service Signal Unit (Ayios Nikolaos) and elements of 33 Signals Unit RAF. It is a three-squadron organisation, commanded by a Royal Signals Lieutenant Colonel, with a number of Royal Air Force and civilian contractors attached. Ayios Nikolaos or Agios Nikolaos is a very common place name in Greece and Cyprus; it is Greek for "Saint Nicholas".

For satellite interception, the Ayios Nikolaos station has a number of dish antennas of various sizes. Somewhere between 2008 and 2011, also a torus antenna was installed, which is able to receive the signals of up to 35 satellites simultaneously.

Declassified documents show that the station was run for the Government Communications Headquarters (GCHQ), and documents released by Edward Snowden indicate that in recent years half the cost of running the station is funded by the U.S. National Security Agency (NSA). Süddeutsche Zeitung newspaper described the base as an Anglo-American collaborative project and wrote that the NSA has personnel on the base, in violation of the agreement between the British and Cypriot governments. GCHQ and NSA use the Ayios Nikolaos station for their global eavesdropping operation. It became the largest GCHQ site outside the UK.

== Over-horizon radar PLUTO ==
The antenna systems of the OTH PLUTO are located near the salt lake of Akrotiri on an area of 100 m × 200 m. This is an over-horizon radar with a transmission power of up to one megawatt. This means that air movements can be observed over the horizon as far as Afghanistan, Kazakhstan and Russia. People in the area have repeatedly complained in the past about the health effects of this system and radio amateurs have noticed interference on various shortwave bands.

== See also ==
- Troodos Station
