= X-Rated: The TV They Tried to Ban =

2005 British television documentary

X-Rated: The TV They Tried to Ban is a 2005 British one-off television documentary examining controversial material on British television. It was first broadcast on Channel 4, at 10pm on Sunday 6 March 2005, as part of their "Banned" season, and was approximately 90 minutes long. The show was produced by Monkey Kingdom.

The TV They Tried to Ban highlighted examples of offensive language, sexually explicit content and disturbing images on television. The documentary itself could have become notable as an explicit programme, but Ofcom received only one complaint for "Offence" caused by the documentary, and did not uphold it because the programme contained sufficient warnings (before it began, at the end of each advert break, and even within the documentary itself). It has been repeated many times, mainly on E4.

It contained contributions from celebrities, media commentators, programme-makers and the critics of explicit broadcasts. Interviewees included Shaun Ryder, Caprice Bourret, Paul Ross, Stephen K Amos, Vince Powell, David Quantick, Garry Bushell and Charlie Parsons.

The TV They Tried to Ban was light-hearted in its tone and narration; it was intended as entertainment rather than a solemn debate (containing gross-out humour and exaggerating Channel 4's role). It implied that 'Complainers' should not be so shocked by television programmes and should choose not to watch. Cole Porter's "Anything Goes" was played during its closing credits; the theme tune to the documentary was The Hives' "Hate to Say I Told You So".

== Criticism ==
One of the 'Complainers', unhappy with her portrayal in the documentary, complained to Ofcom, citing unfair treatment and a failure to fully explain the format of the programme to her. While Ofcom suspected that "there may have been a lack of frankness on the programme makers' part regarding the general tone", it concluded that her views had not been misrepresented, and did not uphold the complaint.

One observer called the documentary a "back-slapping orgy", reflecting Channel 4's possible tendency to overstate its own importance or bravery in showing 'daring' material on television.

== Synopsis ==
=== Part 1 ===
The first half-hour part of The TV They Tried to Ban examines use of offensive language on British television, including the 1976 live interview with the punk band the Sex Pistols on Bill Grundy's Today show on Thames Television, which included swearing rarely before heard on television, least of all during prime time, and damaged Grundy's career while launching the band's. The documentary then shows clips from the 1996 controversy on TFI Friday during which singer Shaun Ryder and actor Ewan McGregor both said "fuck" on the live early-evening show. This caused it to become pre-recorded, and Shaun Ryder's name to be put on the official Channel 4 charter forbidding him from appearing live on the channel. Ryder, in fact, swore 14 times during his live performance of "Pretty Vacant" - a song originally by the Sex Pistols. Its publishers, however, prevented Ryder's version of the song from being used in The TV They Tried to Ban, and an on-screen message here calls them "Spoilsports".

The documentary shows how accepted the "f-word" has become on British television, by pointing out that celebrity chef Gordon Ramsay said "fuck" 84 times in a single episode of documentary Ramsay's Kitchen Nightmares. "Cunt", on the other hand, remains a highly objectionable word: The TV They Tried to Ban shows its first televised use, by a protester (actually Felix Dennis) who 'invaded' the studio of David Frost's chat show The Frost Programme (the protester was immediately criticised as immature by Frost). We then see the almost-unnoticed incident, on This Morning on 16 February 2002, when Caprice mentioned that she was appearing in The Vagina Monologues in a segment called "Reclaiming 'Cunt'". This received three complaints and was not even noticed by presenters Fern Britton and John Leslie at the time, but a tabloid frenzy ensured that Caprice was "kicked off the show". The documentary then shows a single frame from satirical comedy Brass Eye, that caused controversy in 1997; Chris Morris superimposed the words "Grade Is A Cunt" onto the screen, to protest against the then-Channel 4 commissioner Michael Grade's censoring of a scene involving a fictional musical about serial killer Peter Sutcliffe.

Continuing the theme of offensive language, The TV They Tried to Ban claims that 1970s British sitcoms like Love Thy Neighbour and Mind Your Language were loved by "middle England" but are embarrassing today because of their racism. Vince Powell, creator of both series, defends Mind Your Language by saying "All I was doing was making fun of the English language, not the foreigners". Stephen K Amos cites Love Thy Neighbour as increasing casual racism, because it introduced viewers to anti-black (and anti-white) insults they hadn't even heard before. The BBC official whose job is to discourage 'offensive' words is interviewed, and is seen with the list of words that were once seen as the least-desirable for broadcast (predominantly swear words), and the same list in the 2000s, which is markedly different, containing mainly racist, homophobic or anti-disabled insults.

Finally in part 1, a previously unbroadcast advertisement for Channel 4 is seen. Part of a series of adverts, made in 2004, that contained quickly changing clips of presenters and personalities from Channel 4 shows all talking about a particular subject, this advert was on the theme of "favourite swear words", and obviously contains explicit language.

=== Part 2 ===
The second part talks about the portrayal of sex on television in Britain. In the "Swinging Sixties", the documentary claims, no sexually explicit material was allowed on the UK's three TV channels, although in the 1970s some artistic films shown late at night contained nudity. The documentary claims that Margaret Thatcher's 1979 rise to power, shortly after which the Conservative government created Channel 4, actually unleashed "a tide of filth" and 'morally objectionable' content onto British TV screens, because Channel 4's remit compelled it to 'push boundaries' and show programmes for groups not catered-for by the 'mainstream' channels.

Channel 4's Red Triangle film series, (1986–87), is described here by David Quantick as "Like having a little pervert sat in your front room", because of what he claims was often pornographic content in the films. (In reality, few of the Red Triangle films were titillating.) An episode of the BBC drama The Singing Detective (broadcast 30 November 1986), which contained a sex scene, attracted more complaints, as did a 6pm episode of Channel 4's Right to Reply that repeated the scene.

An unusually suggestive sex scene in Footballers' Wives, that the programme's makers freely admit was "soft porn", is the introduction to the documentary's examination of depictions of gay sex on British TV, and the possible hypocrisy in tabloids complaining about gay male characters in EastEnders and Queer as Folk, but describing lesbian-themed period drama Tipping the Velvet as "marvellous" and "a moving drama about the love that can exist between two women", although Garry Bushell obviously realises that contradiction, in joking that it had "nothing to do with the tits!". A censored gay sex scene between two male Footballers' Wives characters is shown in The TV They Tried to Ban – in fact, it had already appeared on ITV2's Footballers' Wives Uncovered, a fact totally unmentioned in this documentary. Interviewed here, one of the Footballers' Wives actors says he was unhappy with the decision to cut his scene, simply because choosing to film it was a difficult decision for a straight actor.

Other controversial broadcasts that are examined in this part of the documentary include Channel 4's Animal Passions, about a group of bestialists in the United States, and a documentary about Derek Jarman's 1976 film Sebastiane. The 1991 documentary contained a scene including an erect penis (supposedly accidentally, as it was on a cinema screen in the background of an interview with Jarman). These are officially not allowed on British television, but The TV They Tried to Ban examines the Mull of Kintyre theory on the subject, and broadcasts the scene again, with an explicit warning immediately before showing it.

=== Part 3 ===
This part of the documentary examined the rise of "lad(ette)" and rave culture in the early 1990s, and how some broadcasters tried to put this youth culture on TV, in such shows as Channel 4's The Word and Something for the Weekend. These late-night series were reflected by rude moments, and concentrating on freakish talents, making for more bizarre entertainment than before; indeed, The Word's most infamous incident involved a young man snogging an elderly woman during "The Hopefuls", a 'famous for 15 minutes' segment. The 'Complainers' suggest that people could have demonstrated their talents by performing a song or a poem instead.

The TV They Tried to Ban then unveils the supposed "top three most offensive British TV moments". X-Rated: Top 20 Most Controversial TV Moments (broadcast on Channel 4 in the same month) revealed a different top three because it used a different system. Here, the top three was named as:

1. Ghostwatch (BBC One, 1992)
2. Jerry Springer: The Opera (BBC Two, shown 2005)
3. Brass Eye Special (paedophilia) (Channel 4, 2001)

=== Part 4 ===
The documentary concludes by asking "Where can controversial TV go next?". More recent controversial programmes are shown, such as Gunther von Hagens's televised autopsy in 2004, which was criticised by some, but welcomed by others who appreciated the insight into how the human body (and treatment of dead bodies) works. A Channel 4 documentary about a man who eats foetuses is also suggested as a pointer of television's possible future direction, and the interviewees suggest (not totally seriously) that executions be shown on TV - Shaun Ryder nominates Ian Huntley to be the first to suffer this fate (although forgets Huntley's name), while another suggests, "let's have burnings on Channel Five". (The programme was made before the high-profile execution of Saddam Hussein, which bears some resemblance to these ideas.) The TV They Tried to Ban plays a moment from news satire The Day Today, which filmed a fake hanging from the 1960s; this is the end of the documentary.

== X-Rated: Top 20 Most Controversial TV Moments ==
This programme presented the 20 most controversial British television programmes, judged on how many official complaints they received at the time.

First shown in March 2005, and presented by E4 puppet characters Bronx Bunny and Teddy T, its conclusion was different from that of The TV They Tried to Ban; Its top four "most offensive" programmes were:

1. Ghostwatch (BBC One, 1992) — 2,215 complaints
2. Jerry Springer: The Opera (BBC Two, 2005) — approx. 1,000
3. Brass Eye Special (Channel 4, 2001)
4. Derren Brown: Seance (Channel 4, 2004)

The reason for this discrepancy was presumably that this documentary only counted complaints made after broadcast by viewers - as Bronx Bunny points out here, Jerry Springer: The Opera would have been in first place, had viewers complained after watching it. In the end, the BBC received approximately 50,000 complaints before screening the controversial opera, mainly from Christians unhappy with Jesus Christ's portrayal.

Ghostwatch's appearance in first place might also have detracted from the theme of The TV They Tried to Ban, as that documentary was about offensive programmes, whereas Ghostwatch only received complaints because it scared or 'fooled' viewers.
