= Mark Hosenball =

American journalist

- Born: Mark Jeffrey Hosenball; 1951 (age 74–75); Cleveland, Ohio
- Occupation: Journalist
- Spouse: Carol O'Donaghue (m. 1977)
- Children: Alex Hosenball

Mark Hosenball is an American national security correspondent and investigative reporter at Reuters. Prior to joining Reuters in September 2010, he worked for Newsweek. He started there in November 1993, after working at Dateline NBC as an investigative producer. He also worked at The Sunday Times, the Evening Standard, Time Out, and contributed articles to The Washington Post, The Wall Street Journal, and The New Republic. He has also done commentaries for American Public Radio.

== Early life and education ==
Hosenball moved to the United Kingdom at age 18 and attended Leighton Park School in Reading, Berkshire for one year. He returned to the United States to attend the University of Pennsylvania, then attended Trinity College, Dublin for three years.

== Career ==
After completing his education in Ireland, Hosenball returned to Britain, where he found work as a journalist. In 1976, while working for Time Out, Hosenball, Duncan Campbell, and Crispin Aubrey (who had also been at Leighton Park School) wrote a story entitled "The Eavesdroppers", which mentioned the existence of Britain's Government Communications Headquarters (GCHQ). Hosenball was deported on grounds of being a "threat to British national security." Although he challenged the order in court, he was denied, and was deported to the United States in 1977.

Hosenball began working for Newsweek as an investigative correspondent in November 1993. Here he covered a range of issues for the National Affairs department. He has also written stories on terrorism and the September 11, 2001 attacks on the U.S., campaign finance, the Clinton-Lewinsky scandal, the death of Princess Diana, Bill and Hillary Clinton Whitewater political investigation, the crashes of EgyptAir Flight 990 and TWA flight 800, and related air safety issues.

Prior to working for Newsweek, Hosenball worked for Dateline NBC as an investigative producer and print journalist. As a print journalist, he contributed to many British and American publications.

== Awards and honors ==
Hosenball has won a number of awards and honors:

- Overseas Press Club's most prestigious honour
- 2002 Ed Cunningham Memorial Award for Hosenball's reporting on the war on terror
- National Magazine Award for General Excellence in 2002 for its coverage of September 11 and its aftermath
- 2002 Edgar A. Poe Award for Excellence for a story he co-authored
- 1991 Peabody Award for his contribution to NBC News coverage of the BCCI scandal

== Personal life ==
Hosenball is married, has a son and currently resides in the Washington, D.C. area.
