= Jolyon Jenkins =

British journalist and radio producer

- Born: Jolyon Jenkins; United Kingdom
- Occupations: Journalist, radio producer
- Years active: 1980s–present
- Known for: Investigative journalism, BBC Radio 4 documentaries
- Notable work: Out of the Ordinary, The Patch, Zircon affair
- Website: offbeatmedia.co.uk

Jolyon Jenkins is a British investigative journalist and radio documentary producer known for his work with BBC Radio 4, BBC Television, and the New Statesman magazine. Over a career spanning several decades, he has researched, presented, and produced numerous documentaries covering a wide range of topics including politics, technology, social issues, and the environment.

== Career ==
In the 1980s, Jenkins worked in investigative journalism. He was a researcher for journalist Duncan Campbell on the proposed BBC documentary about the Zircon affair, part of the Secret Society series. During the controversy over the programme, police searched the homes of the implicated journalists, including Jenkins, and offices of the New Statesman.

By the early 1990s, he was deputy editor of the New Statesman.

Jenkins later transitioned into radio documentary production. He often acts as both producer and presenter. He created several series for Radio 4, including Out of the Ordinary, which explored unusual science and culture topics. He also co-hosted The Patch, a series where journalists travelled to random UK postcodes to find local stories.

== Reception ==
The Glasgow Herald described him as "the go-to guy for quirky subjects which require intelligence and chutzpah in equal measure", while the Radio Times has noted that "Jenkins makes some of the most original documentaries on Radio 4" and in the same publication, David Gillard noted "Whatever subject Jolyon Jenkins is dealing with I will listen ... I regard him as one of our finest broadcasters" The Daily Telegraph's Gillian Reynolds has highlighted his journalism on multiple occasions, calling him a "shrewd observer of the offbeat", "a documentary maker with an acute sense of the dramatic", and "a truly gifted radio reporter, writer, and producer"
