= Zircon (satellite) =

Cancelled British spy satellite

Zircon was the codename for a British signals intelligence satellite, designed to intercept radio and other signals from the USSR, Europe and other areas. It was intended to be launched in 1988 on a NASA space shuttle. However, the project was cancelled in 1987 because of its cost. Secrecy about the project's cost, hidden from the British Parliament, resulted in the Zircon affair.

== History ==
During the Cold War, Britain's GCHQ often used the United States National Security Agency (NSA) for communications interception from space. Concern heightened at the time of the 1982 Falklands War. GCHQ requested access to American signals intelligence satellites to assist in monitoring Argentine communications, but reportedly struggled with the NSA to gain appropriate tasking time, despite the special relationship between the two countries. The United States satellites were engaged in monitoring SIGINT traffic elsewhere in South America related to El Salvador. GCHQ therefore decided to produce a UK-designed-and-built signals intelligence satellite, to be called Zircon, a code-name derived from zirconium silicate, a diamond substitute. Its function was to intercept radio and other signals from the USSR, Europe and other areas. The satellite was to be built at Marconi Space and Defence Systems at Portsmouth Airport, at which a new high security building had been built. It was to be launched on a NASA Space Shuttle under the guise of "Skynet IV" one of the British Skynet military communications satellites. Launch on the Shuttle would have entitled a British national to fly as a payload specialist and a group of military pilots were presented to the press as candidates for 'Britain's first man in space'.

Zircon was cancelled by Chancellor Nigel Lawson on grounds of its cost in 1987. However, Duncan Campbell, an investigative journalist working for New Statesman magazine, planned to make a BBC television programme about the project, part of a six-part series called Secret Society. Campbell's thesis was that the cost of the satellite had been hidden from the British Parliament, in particular the Public Accounts Committee.

== Zircon affair ==
As a result of TV interviews that were filmed with officials, particularly Sir Ronald Mason, the government's chief scientific adviser to the MoD, the government became aware that Campbell knew about the project. Shortly before the programme was due to be transmitted, in January 1987 the New Statesman published an account of Zircon. This triggered Special Branch police raids on the BBC offices in Glasgow, the offices of the New Statesman, and the homes of Campbell and his researchers, Jolyon Jenkins and Patrick Forbes. Master tapes were removed from the BBC, the government obtained an injunction preventing transmission of the programme, and the BBC postponed the transmission of the entire series. Four episodes were transmitted in April and May 1987, and the Zircon programme was transmitted separately in September 1988. The sixth episode, titled Cabinet, was held back indefinitely, and eventually remade and broadcast by Channel 4 in April 1991.

== See also ==
- Ariel 1
- Prospero X-3
