= John Willis (inventor) =

British cleric, stenographer and mnemonician (d. 1625)

John Willis, (ca. 1575 – 28 November 1625) was a British clergyman, stenographer and mnemonician. He developed a simple style of shorthand based on the work by Timothy Bright.

== Early life ==
Willis graduated from Christ's College, Cambridge, in 1592.

== Clergyman and later life ==
On 12 June 1601 he was admitted to the rectory of St. Mary Bothaw, Dowgate Hill, London. He resigned in 1606 on being appointed rector of Bentley Parva, Essex.

== Shorthand ==
In 1602 he published The Art of Stenographie, which was a new and more practicable system to capture speech in short writing. His shorthand was based on a system of arbitrary equivalent symbols, one for each single letter of the alphabet.

== Works ==
- The Art of Stenographie, London, 1602
