= USS John Willis =

Dealey-class destroyer escort

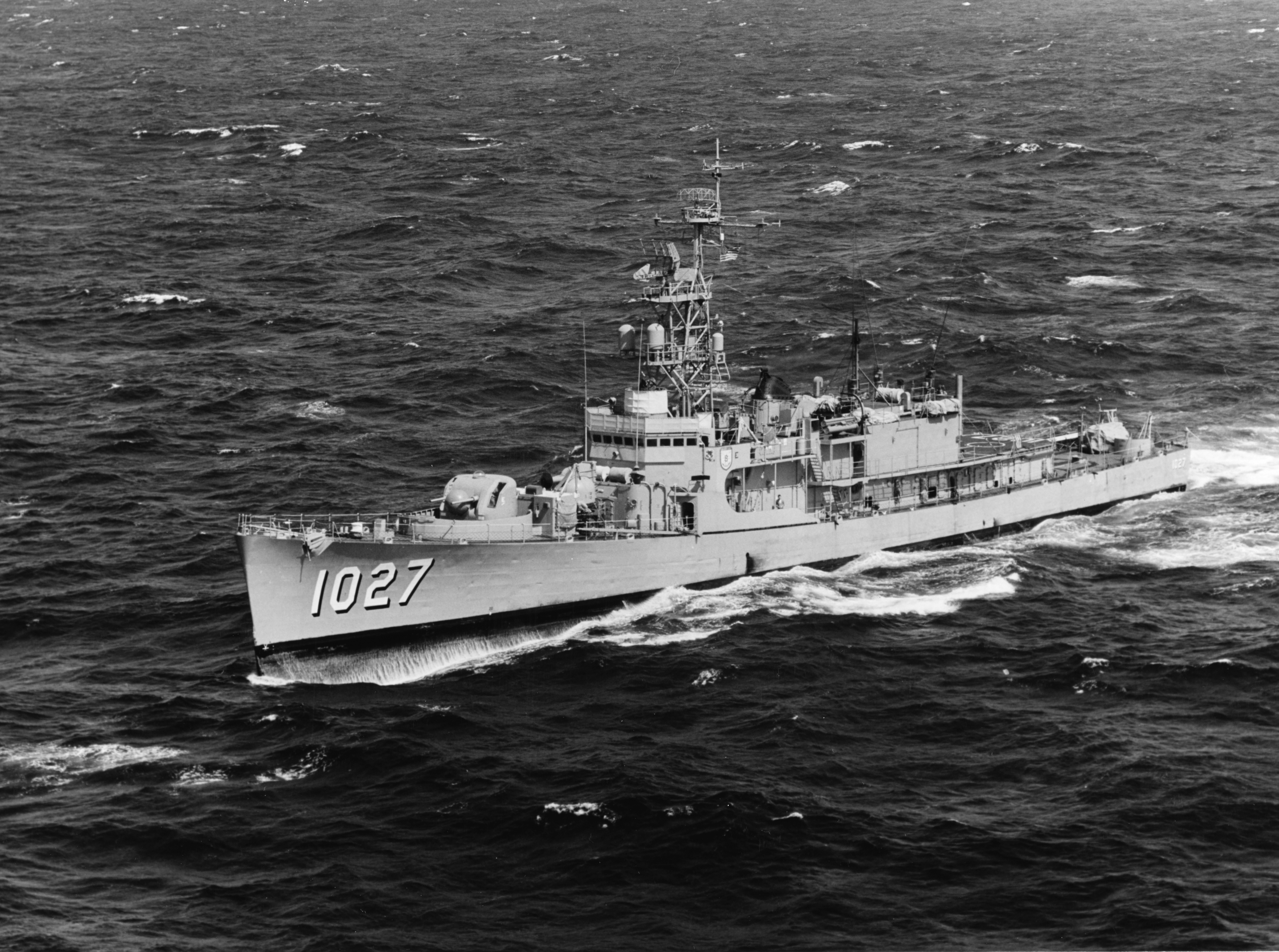

History

United States
- Name: USS John Willis
- Namesake: John Harlan Willis
- Builder: New York Shipbuilding Company
- Laid down: 5 July 1955
- Launched: 4 February 1956
- Commissioned: 21 February 1957
- Stricken: 14 July 1972
- Fate: Sold for scrap 1973

General characteristics
- Class & type: Dealey-class destroyer escort
- Displacement: 1,877 long tons (1,907 t) full load
- Length: 314 ft 6 in (95.86 m)
- Beam: 36 ft 9 in (11.20 m)
- Draft: 18 ft (5.5 m)
- Propulsion: 2 × Foster-Wheeler boilers; 1 × De Laval geared turbine; 20,000 shp (15 MW); 1 shaft
- Speed: 27 knots (31 mph; 50 km/h)
- Range: 6,000 nmi (11,000 km) at 12 kn (14 mph; 22 km/h)
- Complement: 170
- Armament: 4 × 3-inch/50 caliber guns; 1 × Squid ASW mortar; 6 × 324 mm (12.8 in) Mark 32 torpedo tubes; Mark 46 torpedoes

USS John Willis (DE-1027) was a Dealey-class destroyer escort in the United States Navy in service from 1957 to 1972.

== Service history ==
John Willis was launched by the New York Shipbuilding Company of Camden, New Jersey on 4 February 1956, and was sponsored by Mrs. Winfrey M. Duke, widow of John Willis. She was commissioned at Philadelphia Naval Yard on 21 February 1957. She was named for John Harlan Willis, a navy hospital corpsman who at Iwo Jima was awarded the Medal of Honor posthumously.

=== 1950s ===
John Willis reported to Newport, Rhode Island, 7 April for duty with the Atlantic Fleet. Following two months of shakedown along the Atlantic coast and in the Caribbean, she departed Guantanamo Bay, Cuba, 7 June for a five-week cruise to Northern Europe that carried her to Dutch, German, and Danish ports on the North and Baltic Seas. Upon her return to Newport 14 July, the destroyer escort commenced 10 months of ASW exercises along the Atlantic coast in preparation for deployment with the 6th Fleet in the Mediterranean.

She steamed from Newport on 12 May 1958, for the Mediterranean; and following her arrival at Gibraltar on 21 May, the warship sailed with units of the 6th Fleet to participate in joint North Atlantic Treaty Organization (NATO) antisubmarine exercises in the Eastern Mediterranean. The pro-Western government of Iraq fell to Arab nationalists on 14 July, and on 15 July President Chamoun of Lebanon requested U.S. aid to thwart the possible overthrow of his government. In response President Dwight D. Eisenhower dispatched the 6th Fleet to Lebanon and ordered Marines to land at Beirut to protect "Lebanon's territorial integrity and independence." John Willis joined the Lebanon Patrol on 18 July and for the next two months remained on intermittent patrol. As the Middle East crisis eased in September, John Willis departed the Eastern Mediterranean on 14 September, and sailed for the United States, putting into Newport on 7 October.

=== 1960s ===
On 29 November she entered the New York Shipyard to receive an experimental model of the Variable Depth Sonar (VDS) and thus became the first of the destroyer escorts to employ this latest development in ASW equipment. Resuming her operations 4 February 1959, she spent the remainder of 1959 and the early part of 1960 testing and evaluating the new equipment and conducting ASW exercises along the Atlantic coast from Newfoundland to Key West. Following a demonstration of the VDS for the Second Inter-American Naval Conference at Key West in late May, John Willis joined the Atlantic Fleet for four months of American and NATO Operations "Sea Spray" and "Sword Thrust," in the North Atlantic. She retired to Plymouth, England, 2 October but on the 10th rejoined the NATO forces for Exercise "Pipe Down."

John Willis returned to Newport 20 October, and resumed coastal operations. On 8 May 1961 she sailed to Guantanamo Bay for patrol duty along the Windward Passage of the Caribbean. Following the assassination of Dominican Dictator Trujillo on 27 May, the warship conducted patrols along the coast of the Dominican Republic. She departed the Caribbean 25 June and sailed via Key West for homeport. The destroyer escort returned to the Caribbean on 2 December after participating in the recovery of the Project Mercury MA-5 spacecraft, which on 29 November, twice orbited the Earth with a chimpanzee, Enos, on board.

In response to a request for aid by President Balaguer, who feared that supporters of slain Dictator Trujillo would topple the democratic government in the Dominican Republic, President John F. Kennedy ordered units of the Atlantic Fleet into the area to illustrate America's support for the established government. John Willis sailed to the Dominican Republic on 2 December and commenced seven days of patrol duty after which she returned to Newport to prepare for another cruise to Northern Europe.

She sailed for Portsmouth, England on 8 January 1962, and reached the English coast 19 January. While sailing the North Sea on 23 January en route to Horton, Norway, she assisted units of the British Navy during search and rescue operations for stricken Norwegian ship, Eystein. John Willis put into Horton on 24 January and for three weeks sailed to several Norwegian ports while officers and engineers of the Royal Norwegian Navy studied the construction details and operational characteristics of this Dealey-class destroyer escort, which had been selected as the prototype for five new Norwegian warships. Upon completion of her Norwegian cruise, the warship sailed on 15 February for the United States and arrived Newport on 3 March.

John Willis resumed ASW and convoy escort exercises out of Newport and during August received additional ASW equipment. Following 4 months of extensive overhaul, she steamed to the Caribbean on 1 March 1963, for an operational readiness inspection. After returning to Newport on 8 April, she commenced operations on 15 April with a NATO force of 30 ships, engaged in ASW Exercise, "New Broom Eleven," in the North Atlantic. After her return to Newport on 25 April, she began 6 months of intermittent training in preparation for an Atlantic Fleet amphibious Exercise, "Phibaswex," scheduled for December. During this training period she conducted convoy escort and ASW maneuvers from Narragansett Bay to Guantanamo Bay; she attended the ASW Tactical School at Norfolk; and she served as a training ship at the Fleet Sonar School at Key West. While engaging in maneuvers designed to detect and destroy nuclear submarines, John Willis provided search and rescue assistance 23 September for a MATS plane, which was lost in the North Atlantic on a flight from Dover, Delaware, to the Azores.

John Willis steamed from Newport on 2 December with Escort Squadron 10 and joined Task Force 180 for amphibious exercise at Vieques in the West Indies. During this exercise she conducted barrier patrols and practiced the latest ASW techniques against nuclear and conventional submarines. On 17 December she was released from the completed exercise and she returned to Newport.

For the next three years John Willis continued to operate along the Atlantic Coast and in the Caribbean while taking part in squadron exercises and serving as school ship at Key West. During the latter half of 1964 and 1965 she participated in UNITAS V and UNITAS VI and made two cruises along the coasts of South America as part of the U.S. sponsored "People-to-People" Program. Between January and June 1966 she underwent extensive overhaul at Boston, Massachusetts where she received DASH capabilities and communications alterations: thence she resumed refresher and readiness training out of Newport. Assigned to Escort Squadron 8, she deployed to European waters on 29 May 1967. After arriving off the Norwegian coast early in June, she operated along the coast of Western Europe during the next month before sailing to join the ever ready and powerful ships of the 6th Fleet in the Mediterranean.

In 1968 John Willis returned to the Sixth Fleet in the Mediterranean to escort the aircraft carrier Essex. The destroyer escort followed Essex to the North Atlantic and returned to Newport in June 1968. During that cruise John Willis visited France, Italy, Belgium, England, Norway, Northern Ireland, and Malta.

== Fate ==
She was stricken from the naval registry on 14 July 1972, and on 8 May 1973, she was sold for scrapping.
