= Channel 4 Banned season =

Series of programmes previously banned from British television

There have been two Channel 4 Banned seasons. The first aired in April 1991 over three weeks and saw the broadcast of a number of films and documentaries which had previously been banned from British television or cinema. The second was in 2004/2005 and consisted of a series of documentaries concerning the history of explicit and controversial material on British television.

== 1991 Banned season ==
Banned was a series of programmes shown over a three-week period in April 1991. The idea for the season was conceived as a statement about the censorship of broadcasting at the time. The season included network television showings of Scum (which was edited to remove some of the violent gang rape scene and the subsequent graphic suicide of the victim), Monty Python's Life of Brian (which was preceded by a warning that viewers may find the film's treatment of religious themes upsetting), the controversial documentary feature The Animals Film and Derek Jarman's Sebastiane and Jubilee. There was also a second broadcast of the controversial 1988 Thames Television documentary Death on the Rock, which investigated the shooting of three members of the IRA by the SAS in Gibraltar, as well as a remake of Duncan Campbell's Secret Society documentary on secret cabinet committees, commissioned after attempts to secure the rights to the original (and unbroadcast) BBC version fell through. The season proved to be controversial and Channel 4 was investigated by the Obscene Publications Squad and referred to the Director of Public Prosecutions.

== 2004/2005 Banned season ==
The Channel 4 Banned season was a series of television documentaries on the UK's Channel 4 in 2004-2005, examining the history of explicit and controversial material on British television, and its infiltration of the mainstream.

These documentaries included (original airdate if known):

- X-Rated: The Pop Videos They Tried to Ban, 24 July 2004 — music videos (IMDb page)
- X-Rated, 9 December 2004 (possibly a.k.a. X-Rated: The Sex Films They Tried to Ban) — about films given the X certificate by the BBFC. (IMDb)
- X-Rated: The TV They Tried to Ban, 6 March 2005 — a history of television programmes that caused controversy, pushed boundaries or were banned in some way. (IMDb)
- X-Rated: Top 20 Most Controversial TV Moments, March 2005 — similar to the above, but measuring the number of complaints that programmes received (IMDb)
- Banned in the UK, 7-10 March 2005 — four-part series demonstrating different kinds of censorship, such as censorship by the government or of art. (IMDb)
- X-Rated: The Ads They Couldn't Show, 10 March 2005 — television advertisements that were controversial, or banned from UK broadcast due to their content. (IMDb)
