= John Willis (cricketer) =

English cricketer

Personal information
- Full name: John William Willis
- Born: 31 August 1886; Rothwell, Northamptonshire, England
- Died: 21 September 1963 (aged 77); Rothwell, Northamptonshire, England
- Batting: Right-handed
- Bowling: Unknown

Domestic team information
- Years: Team
- 1919: Northamptonshire

Career statistics
Competition	First-class
Matches	1
Runs scored	4
Batting average	2.00
100s/50s	–/–
Top score	4
Balls bowled	60
Wickets	–
Bowling average	–
5 wickets in innings	–
10 wickets in match	–
Best bowling	–
Catches/stumpings	–/–
- Source: Cricinfo, 17 November 2011

John William Willis (31 August 1886 – 21 September 1963) was an English cricketer. Willis was a right-handed batsman, though his bowling style is unknown. He was born at Rothwell, Northamptonshire.

Willis made a single first-class appearance for Northamptonshire against Yorkshire in the 1919 County Championship. In Northamptonshire's first-innings he was dismissed for 4 by Roy Kilner, while in their second-innings he was dismissed by the same bowler for a duck. With the ball, Willis bowled a total of ten wicketless overs.

He died at the town of his birth on 21 September 1963.
