= John T. Willis (biblical scholar) =

20th and 21st-century American theologian

- Born: November 21, 1933; Abilene, Texas
- Died: August 21, 2023 (aged 89); Abilene, Texas
- Spouse: Evelyn (Forrest)

Academic background
- Education: Abilene Christian University
- Alma mater: Vanderbilt University (PhD)

Academic work
- Discipline: Biblical studies
- Sub-discipline: Old Testament Studies
- Institutions: Abilene Christian University

John Thomas Willis (November 21, 1933 - August 2023) was an Old Testament scholar. He was a Professor of Old Testament at Abilene Christian University, where he taught the Hebrew Prophets, Psalms, Pentateuch, OT Exegesis and Biblical Hebrew. He is the author of 30 books and over 100 scholarly articles including commentaries on Genesis, 1–2 Samuel and Isaiah in the Living Word Commentary series. He was also a translator of the Theological Dictionary of the Old Testament for Eerdman's.

== Life ==
John Thomas Willis was born November 21, 1933, in Abilene, Texas. He married Evelyn Forrest and they have four children.

== Education ==
Willis earned his B.A. at Abilene Christian University in 1955 and his M.A. in Old Testament in 1956. He earned a PhD. from Vanderbilt University in 1966.

== History and career ==
Willis studied Greek as an undergraduate in the 1950s, but he majored in Old Testament as a graduate student. He moved to Nashville, Tennessee to teach Bible at David Lipscomb College and enrolled at Vanderbilt University. During this time he also preached for a number of churches in Texas and Tennessee.

Willis wrote his doctoral dissertation on "The Structure, Setting and Interrelationships of the Pericopes in Micah." His was an early voice arguing for the unity of the book at a time when redaction critics focused more on the "authentic" fragments. He went on to be a major translator of works in Swedish and German in the field of Old Testament Studies. He authored a number of well-received commentaries on Genesis, 1–2 Samuel and Isaiah in the Living Word Commentary series as well as editing the volume on The World and Literature of the Old Testament in that series. In his retirement he continued to publish scholarly articles and books in the field of Old Testament studies. He also wrote a number of biblical studies for a popular audience.

Willis made a lasting contribution through his teaching particularly within the American Restoration movement (Churches of Christ). Willis taught at David Lipscomb College in Nashville from 1966 to 1971 when he moved back to Abilene and taught for 46 years until his retirement in 2017, for a total of 61 years of teaching. At his retirement a Festchrift was published in his honor, Worship and the Hebrew Bible: Essays in Honor of John T. Willis ed.by M. Patrick Graham, Rick R. Marrs, and Steven L. McKenzie, Sheffield Academic Press (1999).

== Works ==
selected list
(Translator) A Rigid Scrutiny: Critical Essays on the Old Testament, by Ivan Engnell. Vanderbilt University Press (1969)

- My Servants the Prophets, Vol. 1–2 (The Way of Life Series). Biblical Research Press (1971)
- My Servants the Prophets Vol. 3–4 (The Way of Life Series). Biblical Research Press (1972)
- Insights from the Psalms Vol. 1–3 (The Way of Life Series). Biblical Research Press (1974)
- Essays on Old Testament Ethics: J. Philip Hyatt, In Memoriam ed. James L. Crenshaw, John T. Willis. KTAV (1974)
- The Message of Old Testament History Volume 1: Adam to Moses (The Way of Life Series). Biblical Research Press (1976)
- The Message of Old Testament History Volume 2: Joshua to Ruth (The Way of Life Series). Biblical Research Press (1977)
- The Message of Old Testament History Volume 3: Samuel to Solomon (The Way of Life Series). Biblical Research Press (1978)
- The Message of Old Testament History Volume 4: Rehoboam to Nehemiah (The Way of Life Series). Biblical Research Press (1978)
- The Old Testament Wisdom Literature: Job, Proverbs, Ecclesiastes, Song of Solomon (The Way of Life Series). Biblical Research Press (1982)
- The World and Literature of the Old Testament, The Living Word Commentary on the Old Testament, Vol 1. ed. John T. Willis, Sweet Publishing Company (1979), ACU Press (1984)
- Genesis. The Living Word Commentary on the Old Testament, Vol 2 Sweet Publishing Company (1979), ACU Press (1984)
- 1 and 2 Samuel. The Living Word Commentary on the Old Testament, Vol 6. Sweet Publishing Company (1979), ACU Press (1984)
- Isaiah. The Living Word Commentary on the Old Testament, Vol 12. Sweet Publishing Company (1980), ACU Press (1984)
- Yahweh and Moses in conflict : the role of Exodus 4:24–26 in the book of Exodus. Peter Lang (2010)
- Instruction shall go forth : studies in Micah and Isaiah. ed. Timothy M Willis; Mark W Hamilton, Pickwick Publications (2014)
- Images of water in Isaiah. Lexington Books (2017)
