= John Willis (television executive) =

British television executive and historian

- Education: Fitzwilliam College, Cambridge
- Occupations: Television executive, historian, author
- Known for: Former Director of Programmes at Channel 4, Director of Factual and Learning at BBC, Chair of BAFTA (2012–2014)

John Willis is a British television executive, documentary film director, and historian. He is known for his extensive career in British broadcasting, having held senior leadership roles including Director of Programmes at Channel 4 and Director of Factual and Learning at the BBC. Willis served as the chairman of the British Academy of Film and Television Arts (BAFTA) from 2012 to 2014. As a historian and author, he has published several books focused on the Second World War.

== Early life and education ==
Willis was educated at Eltham College, an independent school in London, where he was Head Boy. He subsequently attended Fitzwilliam College, Cambridge, where he read history.

== Television career ==
Willis began his television career as a documentary maker at Yorkshire Television. During his time there, he directed and produced several investigative documentaries, including his 1975 film Johnny Go Home, which earned him a BAFTA award for Best Factual Programme in 1976. Other notable documentaries directed by Willis during this period include Alice: A Fight for Life and Rampton: The Secret Hospital.

In 1988, Willis moved to Channel 4 as Controller of Factual Programmes, where he introduced established documentary strands such as Cutting Edge and True Stories. He was promoted to director of programmes in 1993. Under his tenure, Channel 4 broadcast successful television series including Father Ted and The Big Breakfast, and backed significant British films including Four Weddings and a Funeral and Trainspotting.

Following his departure from Channel 4, he served as a production executive at Granada and became managing director of United Productions. In 2002, he moved to the United States to serve as Vice-president of National Programs at WGBH Boston, a major American public television station.

Willis returned to the United Kingdom in 2003 to join the BBC as director of factual and learning. After leaving the BBC, he was appointed chief executive of Mentorn, the production company behind the BBC's flagship political debate programme Question Time.

== Board memberships and affiliations ==
Willis has been a member of BAFTA for over 30 years and served as a trustee starting in 2007. In 2012, he was elected as the chairman of BAFTA, serving in that role until 2014. In 2017, he was appointed chairman of the board of governors at the Royal Central School of Speech and Drama, University of London, replacing Paul Taiano.

== Historical writing ==
Returning to his academic background in history, Willis has authored several books focusing on personal accounts from the Second World War. His works include Churchill's Few (2020), which profiles participants in the Battle of Britain, and Secret Letters (2020). In 2022, he published Nagasaki: The Forgotten Prisoners, detailing the experiences of Allied prisoners of war who survived the atomic bombing. His 2024 book, Fighter Boy, is a biography of the heavily burned Battle of Britain pilot Geoffrey Page. In 2025, he released The People's War, which recovers material from the BBC's extensive oral history archives to recount the war from the perspective of ordinary citizens.

== Selected filmography ==
- Johnny Go Home (1975) – Director / Producer
- Rampton: The Secret Hospital (1979) – Director
- Alice: A Fight for Life (1982) – Director

== Selected bibliography ==
- Willis, John (2020). Churchill's Few: The Battle of Britain. Mensch Publishing. ISBN 978-1912914050.
- Willis, John (2020). Secret Letters: A Battle of Britain Love Story. Mensch Publishing. ISBN 978-1912914173.
- Willis, John (2022). Nagasaki: The Forgotten Prisoners. Mensch Publishing. ISBN 978-1912914425.
- Willis, John (2024). Fighter Boy: The Many Lives of Geoffrey Page. Mensch Publishing. ISBN 978-1912914678.
- Willis, John (2025). The People's War: Unheard Stories. BBC Books. ISBN 978-0712652841.
