= John Harlan Willis =

United States Navy Medal of Honor recipient (1921–1945)

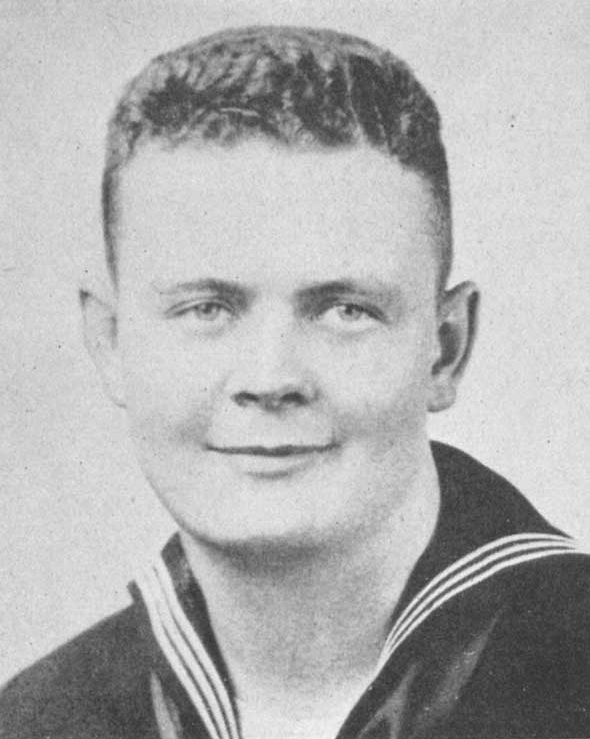
- PhM1c John Willis, U.S. Navy Reserve; Medal of Honor recipient
- Born: June 10, 1921; Columbia, Tennessee
- Died: February 28, 1945 (aged 23); Iwo Jima, Bonin Islands
- Burial place: Rose Hill Cemetery, Columbia, Tennessee
- Military career
- Allegiance: United States of America
- Branch: United States Navy
- Service years: 1940–1945
- Rank: Pharmacist's Mate First Class
- Units: 3rd Battalion, 27th Marine Regiment
- Conflicts: World War II; Battle of Iwo Jima †
- Awards: Medal of Honor; Purple Heart Medal (2)

John Harlan Willis (June 10, 1921 – February 28, 1945) was a United States Navy hospital corpsman who was killed in action during World War II while serving with a Marine Corps rifle company. He was posthumously awarded the nation's highest military decoration for valor, the Medal of Honor, for heroic actions "above and beyond the call of duty" on February 28, 1945, during the Battle of Iwo Jima.

== Biography ==
Willis was born on June 10, 1921, in Columbia, Tennessee. He graduated from Columbia Central High School.

=== U.S. Navy ===
==== World War II ====
He enlisted in the U.S. Navy on November 5, 1940. He received navy recruit training at Naval Training Station, Norfolk, Virginia and hospital corpsman training at the Norfolk Naval Hospital, Portsmouth, Virginia. In March 1941, Willis was promoted to seaman second class and was briefly assigned to the Naval Hospital, Parris Island, South Carolina, transferring to Naval Air Station, Jacksonville, Florida, in the late spring. In August 1941, he was promoted to hospital apprentice first class and, in December, to pharmacist mate third class. After receiving a promotion to pharmacist mate second class in September 1942, Willis served with Naval Operating Base Units, organizing and training units for overseas service. On July 1, 1943, he was promoted to pharmacist's mate first class. That November, he joined the Training Detachment, Field Medical School Battalion, Fleet Marine Force (FMF) Training Center at Camp Elliott, San Diego, California, transferring in early 1944 to Headquarters Company, 3rd Battalion, 27th Marine Regiment, 5th Marine Division at Camp Pendleton, California.

On February 19, 1945, he landed with the 3rd Battalion, 27th Marines on Iwo Jima. He participated in the Battle of Iwo Jima as a rifle company platoon corpsman and, on February 28, while aiding fallen Marines during a fierce action near Japanese-held Hill 362, he was wounded by shrapnel and ordered back to the battle-aid station. Disregarding his injuries, Willis returned to the battle area to resume casualty assistance. He was treating a wounded Marine when the enemy attacked his position with hand grenades. After throwing eight grenades back at the enemy, he was killed when a ninth grenade exploded in his hand. For his heroic actions that day during the battle, Willis was posthumously awarded the Medal of Honor.

Willis, aged 23 at his death, was buried at Rose Hill Cemetery in his hometown of Columbia, Tennessee.

On December 3, 1945, his widow was presented the Medal of Honor on her husband's behalf by the Secretary of the Navy James Forrestal, during a ceremony in Washington, D.C. Present were Willis' mother, son, sister-in-law, and grandfather.

== Medal of Honor citation ==
Willis' official Medal of Honor citation reads:

The President of the United States in the name of The Congress takes pride in presenting the MEDAL OF HONOR posthumously to

PHARMACIST MATE FIRST CLASS JOHN HARLAN WILLIS
UNITED STATES NAVY

for service as set forth in the following

CITATION:

For conspicuous gallantry and intrepidity at the risk of his life above and beyond the call of duty as Platoon Corpsman serving with the 3d Battalion, 27th Marines, 5th Marine Division, during operations against enemy Japanese forces on Iwo Jima, Volcano Islands, 28 February 1945. Constantly imperiled by artillery and mortar fire from strong and mutually supporting pillboxes and caves studding Hill 362 in the enemy's cross-island defenses, Willis resolutely administered first aid to the many marines wounded during the furious close-in fighting until he himself was struck by shrapnel and was ordered back to the battle-aid station. Without waiting for official medical release, he quickly returned to his company and, during a savage hand-to-hand enemy counterattack, daringly advanced to the extreme frontlines under mortar and sniper fire to aid a marine lying wounded in a shellhole. Completely unmindful of his own danger as the Japanese intensified their attack, Willis calmly continued to administer blood plasma to his patient, promptly returning the first hostile grenade which landed in the shell-hole while he was working and hurling back 7 more in quick succession before the ninth exploded in his hand and instantly killed him. By his great personal valor in saving others at the sacrifice of his own life, he inspired his companions, although terrifically outnumbered, to launch a fiercely determined attack and repulse the enemy force. His exceptional fortitude and courage in the performance of duty reflect the highest credit upon Willis and the U.S. Naval Service. He gallantly gave his life for his country.

Harry S. Truman

== Namesake ==
The destroyer escort USS John Willis (DE-1027) was named in his honor. One of the barracks located at the now-closed Naval Hospital Millington, Tennessee was named Willis Hall. The building is now part of the University of Memphis' Millington Center but retains the name Willis Hall.

== See also ==
- List of Medal of Honor recipients for World War II
- List of Medal of Honor recipients for the Battle of Iwo Jima
