= John Willis (priest) =

Irish anglican priest

John Rothwell Willis was an Irish Anglican priest. Educated at Trinity College, Dublin, he was ordained in 1895. After a curacy in Crosspatrick, he held incumbencies at Preban and Gorey. He was Archdeacon of Ferns from 1934 to 1947.
