= John Willis (judge) =

Sir John Ramsay Willis (1908 – 29 October 1988) was a British barrister and judge. He was known as J. Ramsay Willis at the planning bar and was known as "Jack" to his friends.

The son of Dr and Mrs J. K. Willis, of Cranleigh, Surrey, Willis was educated at Lancing College, where he was a scholar, and Trinity College, Dublin, where he took the BA and LLB. He was called to the English bar at Gray's Inn in 1932.

He was a High Court judge from 1966 to 1980, sitting in the Queen's Bench Division.

== Arms ==
Coat of arms of John Willis

Notes
Displayed on a painting at Gray's Inn.
Crest
Within a wreath Or and Azure a spur rowel Azure.
Escutcheon
Argent a chevron paly of eight Sable and Or between three spur rowels Azure.
Motto
Integritas
