= Duncan Campbell (journalist, born 1952) =

British investigative journalist

Duncan Campbell FRSA
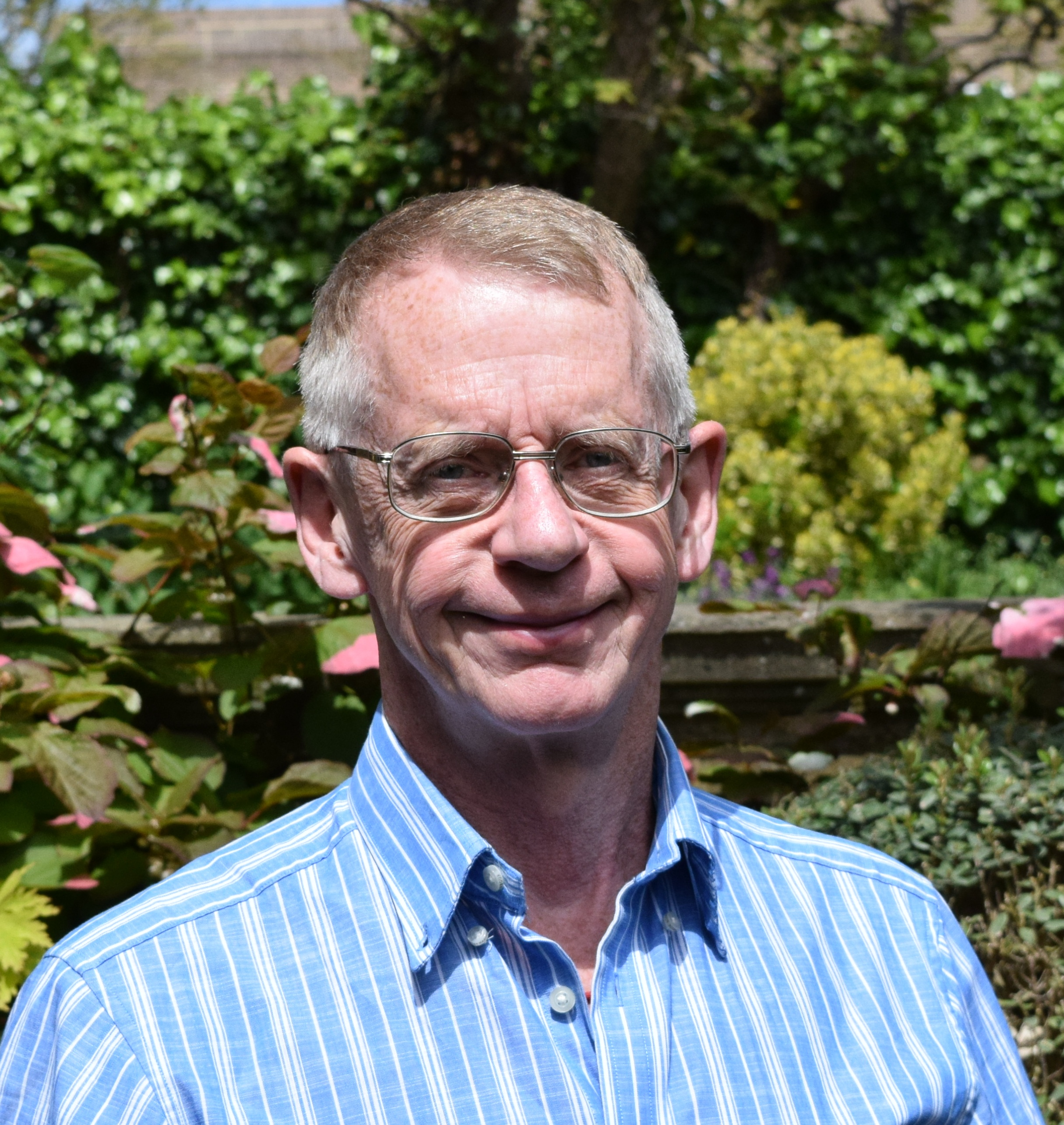
- Campbell in 2015
- Born: 1952 (age 73–74); Glasgow, Scotland
- Education: Brasenose College, Oxford; University of Sussex
- Occupation: Investigative journalist
- Years active: 1975–present
- Known for: Revealing GCHQ (1976); ABC trial under Official Secrets Act (1978); Revealing SCOPG (1980); Zircon affair (1987); Revealing ECHELON (1988); Founder, ICIJ (1997); Criticism of Operation Ore (2005 & 2007)

Duncan Campbell FRSA (born 1952) is a British freelance investigative journalist, author, and television producer. Since 1975, he has specialised in the subjects of intelligence and security services, defence, policing, civil liberties and, latterly, computer forensics.

He was a staff writer at the New Statesman from 1978 to 1991 and associate editor (Investigations) from 1988 to 1991. He was prosecuted under the Official Secrets Act in the ABC trial in 1978 and made the controversial series Secret Society for the BBC in 1987 (see Zircon affair). In 1988, he revealed the existence of the ECHELON surveillance program.

== Early life ==
Born in Glasgow, Scotland, in 1952, Campbell was brought up and educated in Dundee. His mother was a mathematician who had worked at Bletchley Park under Alan Turing. As a pupil at the High School of Dundee, an independent school, he first trained in computer programming aged 16, taught computer languages, and undertook programming in scientific computer languages. He gained three S-levels in physics, chemistry, and maths, and then an open scholarship to Brasenose College, Oxford, graduating in 1973 with a first-class Honours degree in physics. The following year, Campbell completed a one-year MSc in Operational Research at the University of Sussex; the course included psychology, economics, accountancy, and model building. He later told The Independent: "It was extremely useful. It was not difficult to make the grades, though they'll hate me for saying so."

== Early journalism ==
After leaving Sussex University, Campbell became a member of the Brighton Voice collective. Founded in March 1973 by Roy Carr-Hill and George Wilson, the paper's content followed broadly anarcho-socialist principles, with emphasis on reports on housing, the police, gay rights, civil liberties, the environment, unemployment, anti-racism, fascism, and women's rights.

He was also a regular contributor to the New Scientist and Time Out magazines, which during the early 1970s had a much more radical editorial remit than they did in later years. In 1976, Campbell wrote a seminal story for Time Out, co-authored with Mark Hosenball, called "The Eavesdroppers". It was the first time the British news media printed the acronym GCHQ, which stood for Government Communications Headquarters, a highly secretive arm of the British secret services, responsible for communications interception.

The article led to the forcible deportation of its American co-author, Hosenball. Campbell, who could not be deported, was instead placed under MI5 surveillance, which included the tapping of his phones. The following year, Campbell agreed to talk with ex-signals intelligence operator, John Berry, at Berry's home. He was accompanied by fellow Time Out reporter, Crispin Aubrey. After a three-hour conversation, Special Branch arrested the three under the Official Secrets Act 1911, leading to the ABC trial. In 1978, Campbell was convicted by the jury, but punishment was not handed out.

In 1982, Campbell published War Plan UK – the Truth about Civil Defence in Britain, a book which revealed and discussed, often for the first time, the British government's preparations in the event of nuclear war; Campbell perceived these preparations as being geared towards suppressing internal dissent during a crisis period and ensuring the post-attack survival of the government at the cost of much of the wider British population (who were expected to construct "fallout rooms" in their own homes while the government took shelter in purpose-built bunkers).

== Secret Society ==
In November 1985, Campbell was commissioned by BBC Scotland to present and research a six-part, half-hour documentary series called Secret Society, produced by Brian Barr. The series caused a political furore, known as the Zircon affair, in 1987. The production team behind the series was threatened with prosecution under the Official Secrets Act. Campbell's front door was kicked down and his home searched, and Strathclyde Police raided the corporation's Scottish headquarters in Glasgow and seized the tapes from the offices of BBC Scotland, where the series had been made.

The tapes were later returned and the series broadcast on the BBC except for episode one. The BBC decided that the first episode, about secret cabinet committees, was too sensitive to show before the 1987 general election. Labour MP Alistair Darling believed that the Thatcher government leaned on the BBC to prevent its damaging allegations from being made public and that the Zircon affair was merely "an elaborate blind" to get the cabinet committees episode pulled.

Four episodes were broadcast between April and May 1987, with Campbell publishing a written counterpart to each episode in the New Statesman. The Zircon episode was broadcast in September 1988. The cabinet committees episode remained unbroadcast as of 2019, with an attempt to have it broadcast as part of Channel 4's 1991 Banned series ending up with Channel 4 having to remake it from scratch.

=== Episode titles ===
1. The Secret Constitution: Secret Cabinet Committees: about small, secret and influential Cabinet committees. Intended first episode. Original BBC version unbroadcast, but a New Statesman article, titled "Power play in Whitehall", was closely based on the script as approved for transmission. A 1991 Channel 4 remake was also based on Campbell's original script.
2. We're All Data Now: Secret Data Banks: the Data Protection Act is supposed to protect us from abuse, but it's already out of date and full of loopholes. So what kind of abuses should we worry about? Actual first episode. Corresponding New Statesman article titled "The databank dossier".
3. In Time Of Crisis: Government Emergency Powers: since 1982, governments in every other NATO country have been preparing for the eventuality of war. In Britain, these preparations are kept secret. So what will happen when the balloon goes up? Corresponding New Statesman article titled "The final curtain".
4. The Association of Chief Police Officers (ACPO): making up their own law and policy. About the Association of Chief Police Officers and how Government policy and actions are determined in the fields of law and order. Corresponding New Statesman article titled "Policing: a power in the land".
5. A Gap In Our Defences: bungling defence manufacturers and incompetent military planners have botched every new radar system that Britain has installed since World War II. Why? And can we stop it happening again? Corresponding New Statesman article titled "Defences down".
6. Communications Zircon: about GCHQ with particular reference to a secret £500 million satellite. Reference to Zircon spy satellites which the Public Accounts Committee were not told about. No corresponding New Statesman article was published, though Campbell did write an article on Zircon for the magazine's 23 January 1987 issue.

== Notable articles ==
In 1980, his article revealing the existence of the secret Standing Committee on Pressure Groups (SCOPG) in Hong Kong led to the revelation that most pressure groups and individual members of the Opposition were under surveillance by the colonial government. Campbell's article asserts that Hong Kong under then governor Sir Murray MacLehose had become a dictatorship. In his words: "Hong Kong is a dictatorship; and scarcely a benevolent one."

=== ECHELON (1988) ===
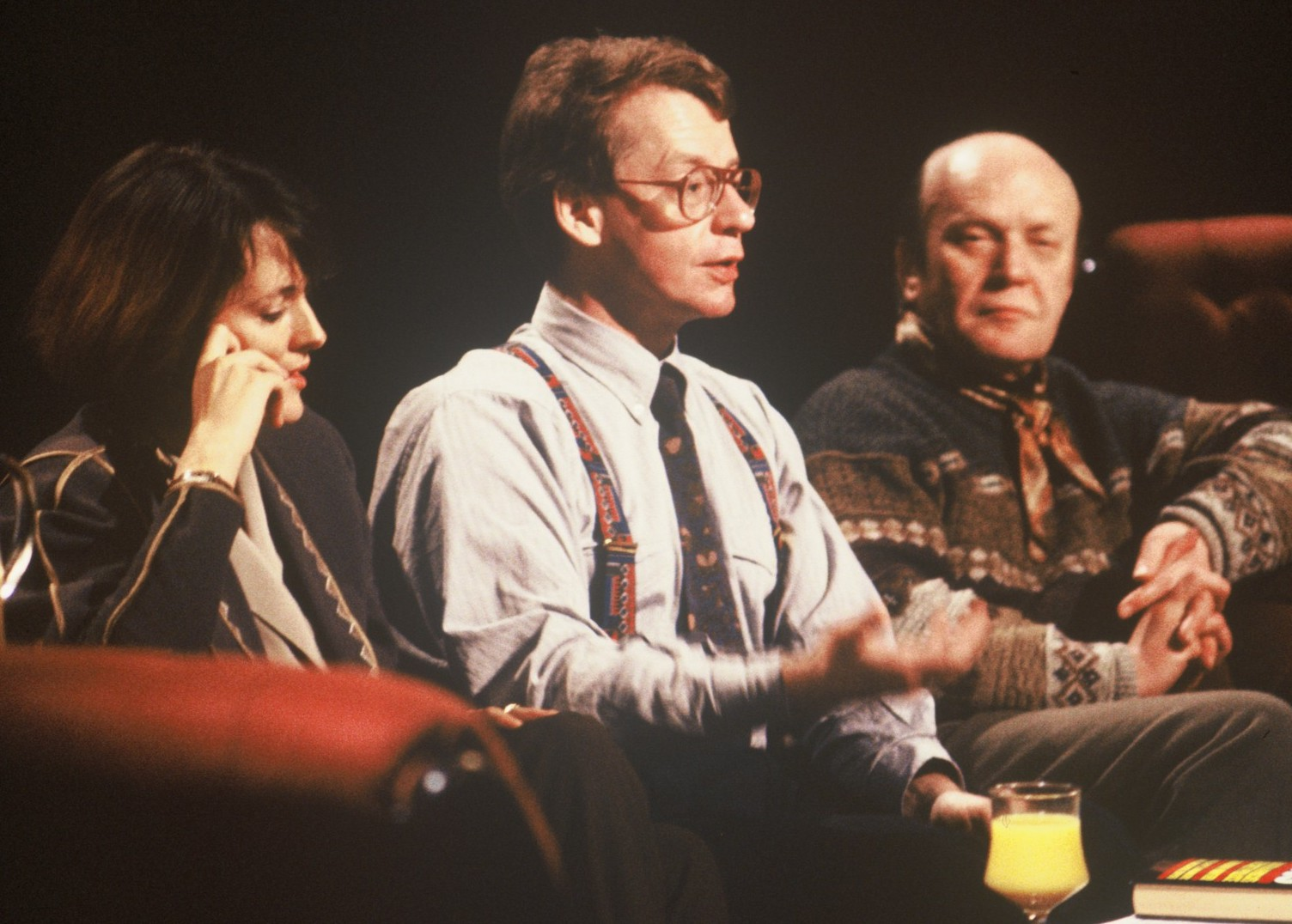
Appearing on TV discussion programme After Dark in 1991

Campbell revealed in 1988, in an article titled "Somebody's listening" and published in the New Statesman, the existence of the ECHELON surveillance program.

In 1999, he wrote a report on communications intelligence entitled Interception Capabilities 2000 for the European Parliament.

=== Child abuse images (2005 and 2007) ===
In 2005 and 2007, Campbell investigated and wrote criticisms of the Operation Ore child pornography prosecutions in the UK, which exposed police errors. Additionally, he "revealed how computer evidence used against 7,272 people in the UK accused of being paedophiles had been founded on falsehoods." These articles, "Operation Ore Exposed" and "Sex, Lies and the Missing Videotape", were both published in PC Pro magazine.

== Personal life ==
Campbell came out as gay in 1987 and has investigated many LGBT issues, including "bogus" HIV/AIDS medicines and quack doctors.

== Awards ==
- 1980 – Cobden Trust Award (for series of New Statesman articles on civil liberties, including an exposé on Britain's secret telephone tapping centre)
- 1983 – Periodical Publishers Association: Specialist Writer of the Year (for reports on nuclear weapons and the Prime spy case)
- 1987 – What the Papers Say: Investigative Journalist of the Year
- 1987 – Freedom of Information Campaign: Media Award
- 1989 – Magazine Publishing Awards: Best Business Feature
