= List of colonial governors and administrators of British Cyprus =

Governor of British Cyprus
- Badge of the governor of Cyprus
- Style: His Excellency
- Residence: Government House, Nicosia
- Appointer: Monarch of the United Kingdom
- Precursor: High Commissioner of Cyprus
- Formation: 10 March 1925
- First holder: Sir Malcolm Stevenson
- Final holder: Sir Hugh Mackintosh Foot
- Abolished: 16 August 1960
- Succession: President of Cyprus

This article lists the colonial governors and administrators of British Cyprus.

Hitherto Ottoman Cyprus, a territory of the Ottoman Empire, a British protectorate under Ottoman suzerainty was established over Cyprus by the Cyprus Convention of 4 June 1878. The United Kingdom declared war on the Ottoman Empire on 5 November 1914 and annexed Cyprus. Turkey recognised British possession of Cyprus by the Treaty of Lausanne on 24 July 1923 and the island became a Crown Colony on 10 March 1925. Following the London and Zürich Agreements of 19 February 1959 Cyprus became an independent republic on 16 August 1960, and joined the Commonwealth of Nations in 1961.

== List of high commissioners (1878–1925) ==
Name (Birth–Death)	Portrait	Term of office	
Lord John Hay (1827–1916) (acting)		12 July 1878	22 July 1878
Sir Garnet Joseph Wolseley (1833–1913)		22 July 1878	23 June 1879
Sir Robert Biddulph (1835–1918)		23 June 1879	9 March 1886
Sir Henry Ernest Gascoyne Bulwer (1836–1914)		9 March 1886	5 April 1892
Sir Walter Joseph Sendall (1832–1904)		5 April 1892	23 April 1898
Sir William Frederick Haynes Smith (1839–1928)		23 April 1898	17 October 1904
Sir Charles Anthony King-Harman (1851–1939)		17 October 1904	12 October 1911
Hamilton Goold-Adams (1858–1920)		12 October 1911	8 January 1915
Sir John Eugene Clauson (1866–1918)		8 January 1915	31 December 1918 †
Sir Malcolm Stevenson (1878–1927)		31 December 1918 (acting to 31 July 1920)	10 March 1925

== List of governors (1925–1960) ==
Name (Birth–Death)	Portrait	Term of office	
Sir Malcolm Stevenson (1878–1927)		10 March 1925	30 November 1926
Sir Ronald Storrs (1881–1955)		30 November 1926	29 October 1932
Sir Reginald Edward Stubbs (1876–1947)		29 October 1932	8 November 1933
Sir Herbert Richmond Palmer (1877–1958)		8 November 1933	4 July 1939
William Denis Battershill (1896–1959)		4 July 1939	3 October 1941
Charles Campbell Woolley (1893–1981)		3 October 1941	24 October 1946
Reginald Fletcher, 1st Baron Winster (1885–1961)		24 October 1946	4 August 1949
Sir Andrew Barkworth Wright (1895–1971)		4 August 1949	February 1954
Sir Robert Perceval Armitage (1906–1990)		February 1954	25 September 1955
Sir John Alan Francis Harding (1896–1989)		3 October 1955	22 October 1957
Sir Hugh Mackintosh Foot (1907–1990)		3 December 1957	16 August 1960

=== Deputy governors ===
- Sir George Evelyn Sinclair: 1955–1960

== Commanders ==
The following officers have been in command of British Forces Cyprus:

General Officer Commanding Cyprus District

- 18 March 1955 — Major-General Abdy Ricketts
- 19 October 1956 — Major-General Douglas Kendrew
- 11 October 1958 — Major-General Kenneth Darling

Commander, British Forces in Cyprus

- 16 August 1960 — Air Marshal Sir William MacDonald (Administrator of the SBAs from 1960)
- 16 July 1962 — Air Chief Marshal Sir Denis Barnett, Air Officer Commanding-in-Chief Near East and Commander British Forces in Cyprus.
- 25 September 1964 — Air Marshal T. O. Prickett; Air Vice-Marshal T. O. Prickett CB, DSO, DFC, was "appointed Air Officer Commanding-in-Chief Near East Air Force and Commander, British Forces in Cyprus, with the acting rank of Air Marshal in succession to" Air Chief Marshal Barnett, 25 Sept 1964.
- 21 November 1966 — Air Marshal E. G. Jones "appointed Air Officer Commanding-in-Chief Near East Air Force and Commander, British Forces in Cyprus, with the acting rank of Air Marshal in succession to Air Marshal Sir Thomas Prickett"
- 6 May 1969 — Air Marshal D. G. Smallwood
- 2 July 1970 — Air Marshal W. D. Hodgkinson, Commander, British Forces Near East; AOC in C, Near East Air Force; Administrator, Sovereign Base Areas of Akrotiri and Dhekelia
- 25 June 1973 — Air Marshal Sir John Aiken as Commander, British Forces Near East and Air Officer Commanding-in-Chief Near East Air Force Still Commander British Forces Near East in 1974.

Commander, British Forces Cyprus

- 1 April 1976 — Air Vice-Marshal R. D. Austen-Smith as Commander, British Forces Cyprus/Air Commander, Cyprus and, Administrator, British Sovereign Base Areas - Cyprus on 1 April 1976;
- 28 April 1978 — Major-General W. R. Taylor
- 3 October 1980 — Air Vice-Marshal R. L. Davis
- 31 March 1983 — Major-General Sir Desmond Langley
- 29 October 1985 — Air Vice-Marshal K. W. Hayr
- 21 April 1988 — Major-General J. P. W. Friedberger
- 1990 — Air Vice-Marshal A. F. C. Hunter
- 25 March 1993 — Major-General A. G. H. Harley
- 17 February 1995 — Air Vice-Marshal P. Millar
- 16 January 1998 — Major-General A. I. Ramsay
- 5 September 2000 — Air Vice-Marshal T. W. Rimmer
- 5 September 2003 — Major-General P. T. C. Pearson
- 26 April 2006 — Air Vice-Marshal R. H. Lacey
- 16 October 2008 — Major-General J. H. Gordon
- 4 November 2010 — Air Vice-Marshal G. E. Stacey
- 3 January 2012 — Major-General R. Cripwell
- 20 January 2015 — Air Vice-Marshal M. Wigston
- February 2017 — Major-General J. T. E. Illingworth
- 25 September 2019 – Major-General R. J. Thomson
- 1 September 2022 – Air Vice-Marshal P. J. M. Squires
- 11 April 2025 – Major-General T. H. Bewick

== Flags ==
Flag of the high commissioner of Cyprus (1881–1905)

Flag of the high commissioner of Cyprus (1905–1925) and the governor of Cyprus (1925–1960)

== See also ==
- President of Cyprus
- Vilayet of the Archipelago
