= History of Cyprus (1878–present) =

Cyprus was part of the British Empire, under military occupation from 1914 to 1925, and a Crown colony from 1925 to 1960. Cyprus became an independent nation in 1960. Cyprus became a republic in the Commonwealth of Nations during the 1961 Commonwealth Prime Ministers' Conference in March 1961.

== British Cyprus ==
=== Protectorate of Cyprus (1878−1914) ===
In 1878, as a result of the Cyprus Convention, the United Kingdom received as a protectorate the island of Cyprus from the Ottoman Empire in exchange for United Kingdom's military support to the Ottoman Empire should Russia attempt to take possession of territories of the Ottomans in the Middle East.

The first British administrator was given the title of "High Commissioner", and was Lieutenant-General Garnet Joseph Wolseley. The British faced a major political problem on the island. The indigenous Cypriots believed it their natural right to unite the island with Greece following the collapse of the Ottoman Empire. The British authorities carried out the first census in 1881, the total population of Cyprus was 186,173, of whom 137,631 (73.9%) were Greeks, 45,438 (24.4%) were Turks and 3,084 (1.7%) were Maronites, Latins and Armenians. Bishop of Kitium Kyprianos addressed Wolseley upon his arrival in Larnaca in a speech on 22 July 1878 saying "We (Greeks) accept the change of the government, because we believe that Great Britain will eventually help Cyprus, just like with the Ionian islands, unite Cyprus with mother Greece".

While the Cypriots at first welcomed British rule hoping that they would gradually achieve prosperity, democracy and national liberation, they became disillusioned. The British imposed heavy taxes to cover the compensation which they were paying to the Sultan for having conceded Cyprus to them. Moreover, the people were not given the right to participate in the administration of the island, since all powers were reserved to the High Commissioner and to London.

=== British Cyprus (1914–1960) ===
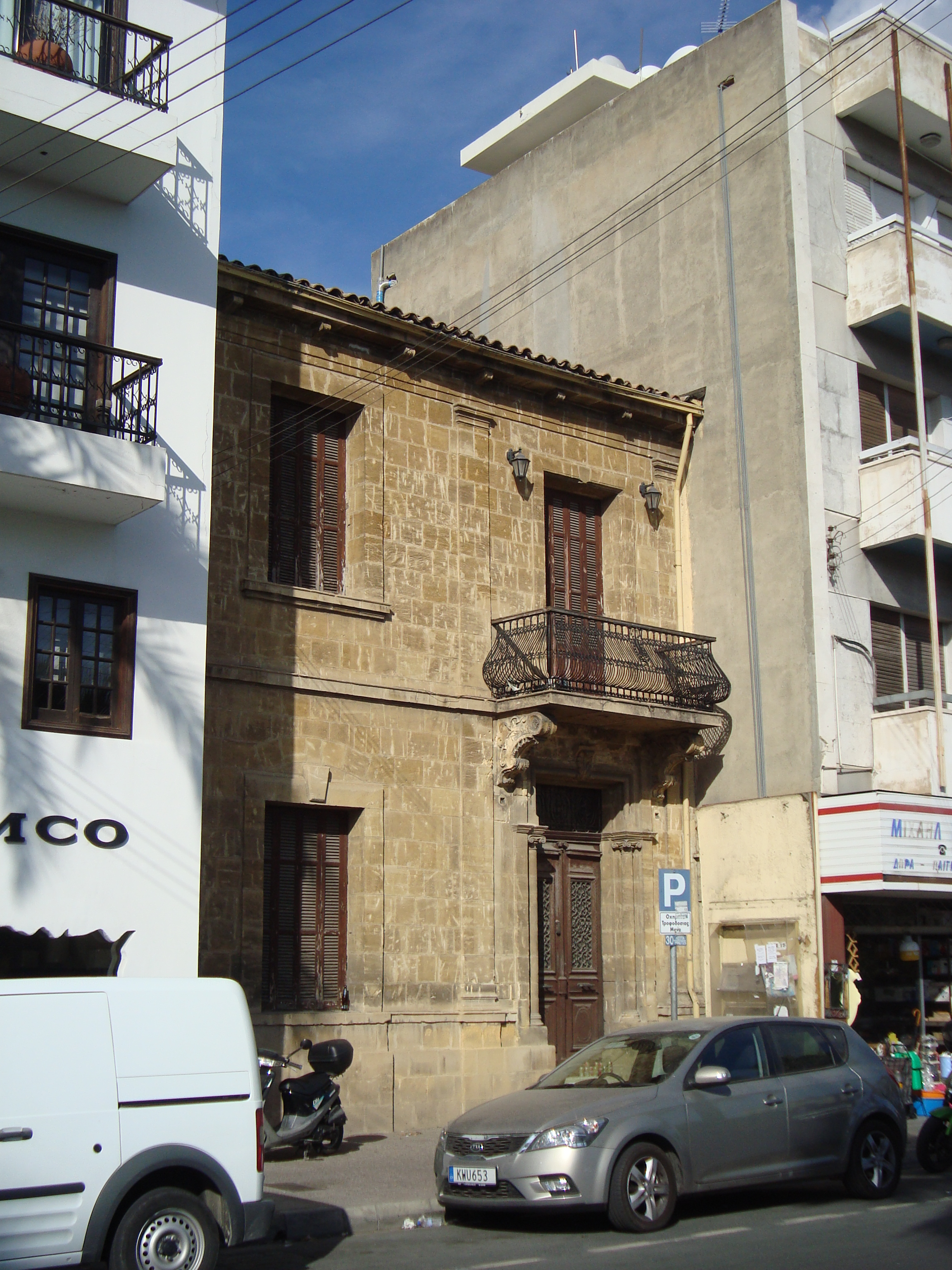
House in Nicosia CBD built in British colonisation era

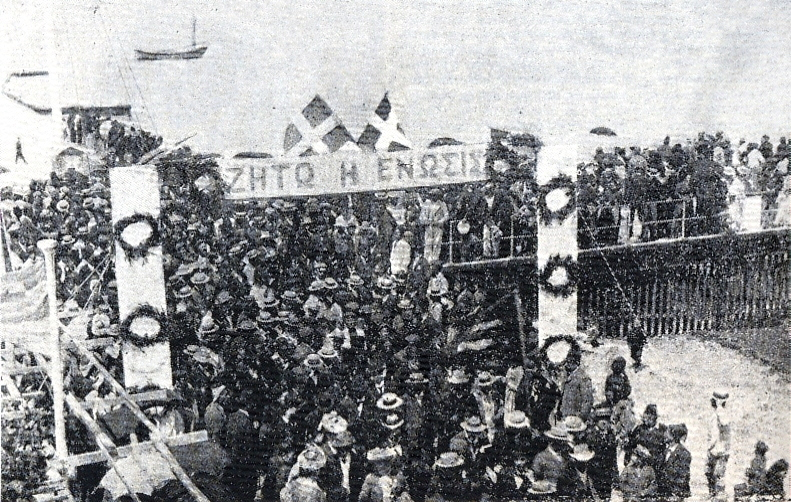
A Cypriot demonstration in the 1930s in favour of Enosis.

Cyprus was part of the British Empire under military occupation from 1914 to 1925 and a Crown colony from 1925 to 1960.

Cyprus's status as a protectorate of the British Empire ended in 1914 when the Ottoman Empire declared war against the Triple Entente powers, which included Great Britain. Cyprus was then annexed by the British Empire on 5 November 1914. During the course of the First World War Britain offered to cede Cyprus to Greece if they would fulfill treaty obligations to attack Bulgaria, but Greece declined.

Britain proclaimed Cyprus the Crown colony of British Cyprus in 1925, under an undemocratic constitution.

International recognition of the new Republic of Turkey resulted from the Treaty of Lausanne in 1923 in which the new Turkish government formally recognised Britain's sovereignty over Cyprus (article 20). The administration was reformed in the latter 1920s, and some members of the Legislative Council (established 1926) were elected by the Cypriots, but their participation was very marginal. The Legislative Council was abolished in 1931.

Greek Cypriots believed the circumstances were right to demand the union of the island with Greece (enosis), as many of the Aegean and Ionian islands had done following the collapse of the Ottoman Empire. In the years that followed, Greek Cypriots' demands for enosis (union with Greece), which the British opposed, developed rapidly during the 1930s, leading to the destruction of the Government House in Nicosia, which was burnt down in the 1931 Cyprus Revolt.

==== Palmerokratia ====
The period between October 1931 and October 1940 was difficult for the Cypriots. The Governor at the time, Sir Richmond Palmer, took a number of suppressive measures including limitations on the administration and functioning of Greek schools, and prohibition of trade unions and associations of any kind and form. This regime became known as "Palmerokratia", named after the Governor. Its aim was to prevent local public interest in politics. There were strong protests against the regime but the suppressive measures were not lifted until the beginning of the Second World War, during which more than thirty thousand Cypriots joined the British armed forces.

Endeavours by the British to introduce constitutional government designed to develop some participation without leading to enosis failed, despite determined efforts to achieve some semblance of liberal and democratic government, notably by the post-war Labour government in Britain.

=== Proposed union with Greece ===
In 1948, King Paul of Greece declared that Cyprus desired union with Greece. In 1950 the Orthodox Church of Cyprus presented a referendum according to which around 97% of the Greek Cypriot population wanted the union. In 1952 both Greece and Turkey became members of NATO.

After the war, a delegation from Cyprus submitted a demand for enosis to London. The demand was rejected but the British proposed a more liberal constitution and a 10-year programme of social and economic development.

Led by Archbishop Makarios, the Greek Cypriot demand for enosis emerged with new force in the 1950s, when Greece began to accord it support on the international scene. This attempt to win world support alerted Turkey and alarmed the Turkish Cypriots.

The British withdrawal from Egypt led to Cyprus becoming the new location for their Middle East Headquarters.

==== Cyprus Emergency ====
When international pressure did not suffice to make Britain respond as required, violence escalated with a campaign against the colonial power organised by EOKA (Ethniki Organosis Kyprion Agoniston). Its leader, Colonel George Grivas, created and directed an effective campaign beginning in 1955. The first bombs were set off on April 1, followed by leaflets. Attacks on police stations started on June 19. The British Governor proclaimed a State of Emergency on 26 November 1955.

For the next four years EOKA attacked British or British-connected targets and those Cypriots it accused of collaboration. Archbishop Makarios and other Cypriot clergy and political leaders were forced into exile in the Seychelles. 371 British servicemen died fighting the independence movement during the Cyprus Emergency, including over 20 in the Operation Lucky Alphonse.

Easily infiltrated by Greek Cypriot sympathisers working for them in various ancillary tasks, the British security forces had to exert great efforts under Field Marshal Sir John Harding to suppress the independence movement. They were much more successful than is often recognised, though the attacks on British personnel never quite ceased. Makarios was exiled, suspected of involvement in the EOKA campaign, but was released when EOKA, exhausted but still determined to fight, agreed to cease hostilities on the Archbishop's release and return.

From mid-1956 onwards there were constant discussions in NATO, but all efforts to create an independent Cyprus which would be a member of the Commonwealth of Nations were futile.

===== Turkish Cypriots =====
The Turkish Cypriot response to the challenges posed by the prospect of decolonization and the breakdown of the colonial order was to adopt the call for partition (taksim). Taksim became the slogan which was used by the increasingly militant Turkish Cypriots in an attempt to mirror the Greek cry of 'enosis'. In 1957 Küçük declared during a visit to Ankara that Turkey would claim the northern half of the island.

In April 1957, in the new conditions made obvious by the Suez Crisis, the British government accepted that bases on Cyprus were an acceptable alternative to Cyprus as a base. This produced a much more relaxed British attitude to the problem. It was now to be solved in conjunction with Greece and Turkey, the latter thoroughly alerted to the dangers of enosis for the Turkish Cypriot population.

Violence was renewed in Cyprus by EOKA, but it increasingly drew in the Turkish community when a new plan for unitary self-government, of British Governor Sir Hugh Foot, incited Turkish Cypriot riots and produced a hostile response from the Turkish government. Violence between the two communities developed into a new and deadly feature of the situation.

In 1957 the U.N. decided that the issue should be resolved according to its Statutory Map. The exiles returned, and both sides began a series of violent acts against each other.

In the few years that existed before the Zürich and London Agreements (1959 /1960) Greece tried again to win international recognition and support for the cause of enosis at the U.N. against a background of renewed and continuing EOKA violence directed against the British. It was to no avail. Eventually Greece had to recognise that Turkey was now a vitally interested party in the dispute.

Grivas and EOKA also had to accept the changed situation. Makarios could see no way of excluding Turkey from participating in any solutions. It was widely believed by the Greek Cypriots that Britain had promoted the Turkish Cypriot case, thus preventing the achievement of enosis.

In 1958 the British Prime Minister Harold Macmillan prepared new proposals for Cyprus, but his plan which was a form of partition, was rejected by Archbishop Makarios. The Archbishop declared that he would only accept a proposal which guaranteed independence, excluding both Enosis and partition.

==== Cypriot constitution ====
On February 19, 1959, the Zürich agreement attempted to end the conflict. Without the presence of either the Greek or the Turkish sides, the UK outlined a Cypriot constitution, which was eventually accepted by both sides. Both Greece and Turkey along with Britain were appointed as guarantors of the island's integrity.

Some of the major points of the Zurich agreement are:

- Cyprus is to become an independent state.
- Both taksim and enosis are to be prohibited.
- Greek and Turkish military forces, at a ratio of approximately 3:2, are to be present at all time in Cyprus. Both forces are to answer to all three foreign ministers: of Greece, Turkey, and Cyprus.
- The President is to be a Greek Cypriot, elected by the Greek Cypriot population, and the Vice President a Turkish Cypriot, elected by the Turkish Cypriot population.
- The Cabinet is to include seven Greek Cypriots, chosen by the President, and three Turkish Cypriots, chosen by the Vice President.
- Decisions will need an absolute majority but both the President and the Vice President have the right of veto.
- The United Kingdom is to remain a guarantor and keep both of its military bases.

== Independence ==
On August 16, 1960 Cyprus gained its independence from the United Kingdom, after the long anti-British campaign by the Greek Cypriot EOKA (National Organisation of Cypriot Fighters), a guerrilla group which desired political union with Greece, or enosis. Archbishop Makarios III, a charismatic religious and political leader, was elected the first president of independent Cyprus on 13 December 1959. In 1961, it became the 99th member of the United Nations.

Cyprus became an independent member of the Commonwealth of Nations during the 1961 Commonwealth Prime Ministers' Conference in March 1961, which met in London, England.

The Zurich agreement, however, did not succeed in establishing cooperation between the Greek and the Turkish Cypriot populations. The Greek Cypriots argued that the complex mechanisms introduced to protect Turkish Cypriot interests were obstacles to efficient government and as such developed the Akritas Plan aimed at forcing all Turkish Cypriot parliamentarians from government so as not to disrupt Greek Cypriot plans of enosis. Both sides continued the violence. Turkey threatened to intervene on the island.

In November 1963, President Makarios advanced a series of constitutional amendments designed to eliminate some of these special provisions. The Turkish Cypriots opposed such changes. The confrontation prompted widespread intercommunal fighting in December 1963, after which the Akritas Plan was put into motion and Turkish Cypriot participation in the central government ceased on December 23, 1963, when all Cypriot Turks from the lowest civil servants to ministers, including the Turkish Vice-president Dr. Fazıl Küçük were out of the government.

Makarios ordered a cease-fire and again addressed the issue to the United Nations. With the government no longer functional, following the controversial but voluntary withdrawal of Turkish Cypriot politicians, UN peacekeepers were deployed on the island in 1964, effectively recognising the remaining Greek Cypriots, in office, as the government. The force, UNFICYP, included Canadian, Irish and Finnish troops. Its mandate was to prevent fighting, maintain law and order. In 1964 the UK Prime Minister, Sir Alec Douglas-Home, met with the American Attorney General, Robert F. Kennedy to explain why international intervention was required, stating that "If they had not done so, there would probably have been a massacre of Turkish Cypriots", who were confined in enclaves totalling little more than 3% of the island. The same year the Turkish parliament voted in favour of the intervention of Cyprus but the lack of support that Turkey faced from both the UN and NATO prevented it. In answer Grivas was recalled to Athens and the Greek military force left the island.

In 1967, on Cyprus Airways Flight 284 a de Havilland Comet suffered an explosion in the cabin, killing 66. The cause and motive were unsolved, but a recovered seat cushion showed traces of a military plastic explosive.

Following another outbreak of inter communal violence in 1967–68, a Turkish Cypriot provisional administration was formed.

=== Greek junta's coup d'état and Turkish invasion of Cyprus ===
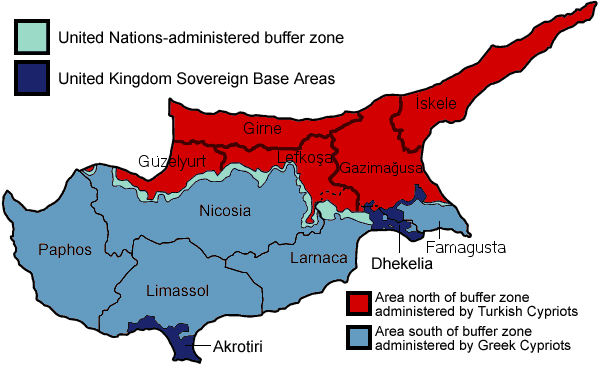
After the invasion Cyprus was separated into a northern area and a southern area, divided by a buffer zone.

In July 1974, the President was overthrown by the 1974 Cypriot coup d'état carried out by Greece, which was under Greek military junta rule.

The Turkish invasion of Cyprus began on 20 July 1974, under Article 4 of the Guarantee Treaty of 1960 by Turkey, after failed UN meetings for international support. The Guarantee Treaty allowed Greece, Turkey, and the United Kingdom, if attempts to get multilateral support failed, to unilaterally intervene to restore democracy in Cyprus in the event of a coup.

In a two-stage offensive, Turkish troops took control of 38% of the island and 200,000 Greek Cypriots fled the northern areas which were under occupation, whilst at the same time 60,000 Turkish Cypriots were transferred to these northern occupied areas by the United Nations and British SBA authorities after an agreed temporary population exchange by Turkish and Greek leaders. Since then, the southern part of the country has been under the control of the internationally recognized government of Cyprus and the northern part under the control of the government of Northern Cyprus.

== Present day ==
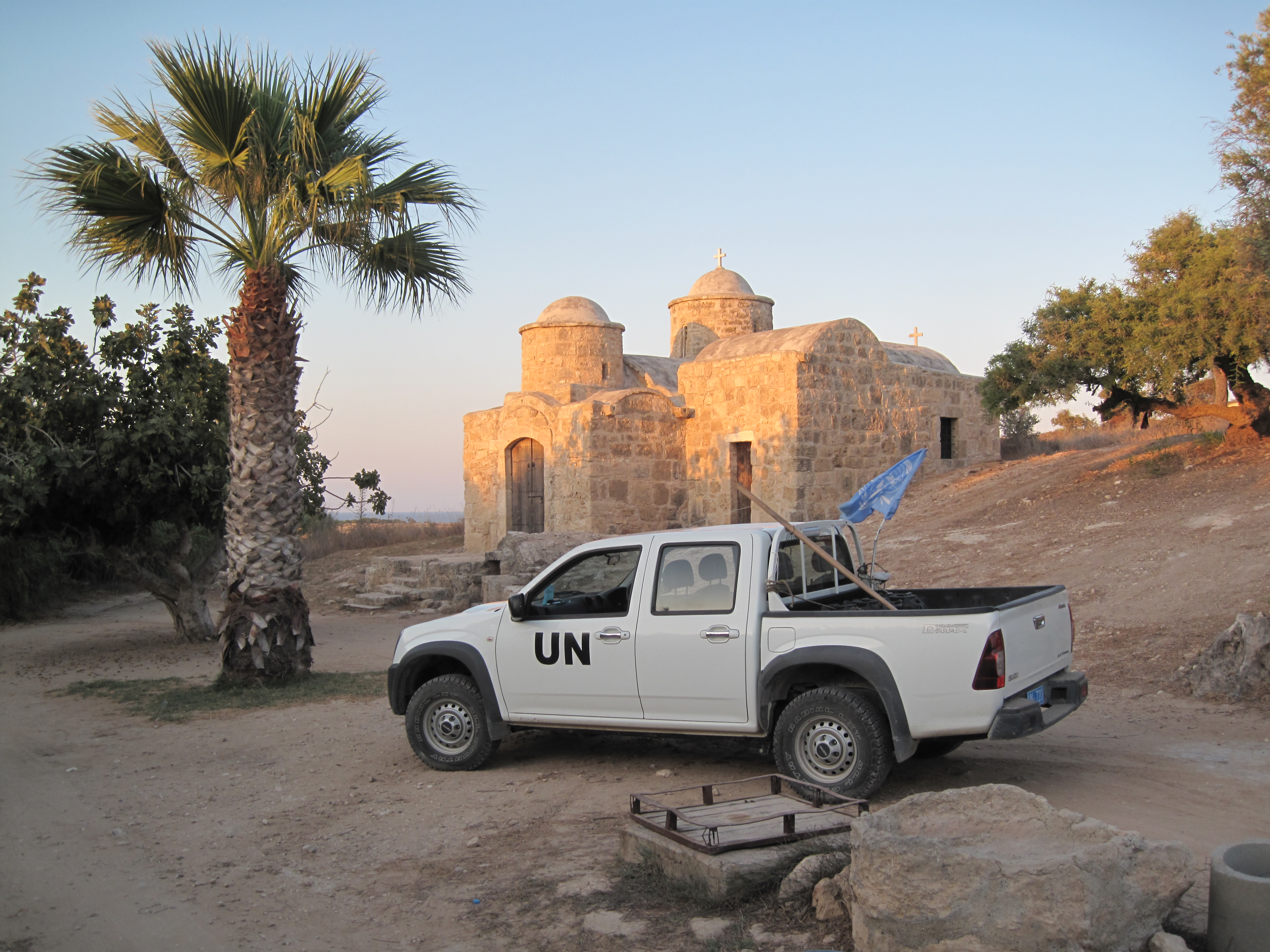
A UNFICYP patrol car in the buffer zone

In 1983, the 1974 Turkish Cypriot-controlled area unilaterally declared itself independent as the Turkish Republic of Northern Cyprus, recognised only by Turkey.

United Nations Peacekeeping Forces maintain a buffer zone between the two sides. Except for occasional demonstrations or infrequent incidents between soldiers in the buffer zone, there was no violent conflict from 1974 until August 1996, when Anastasios (Tassos) Isaac and Solomos Solomou were killed while demonstrating in a motorcycle rally after crossing into the Turkish Republic of Northern Cyprus area. Tassos Isaak was beaten to death by a group of Turkish civilians and three Turkish Cypriot policemen. Solomos Solomou was shot in the throat by a Turkish army officer when he tried to bring the Turkish flag down from a military watch-post.

UN-led talks on the status of Cyprus resumed in December 1999 to prepare the ground for meaningful negotiations leading to a comprehensive settlement. The Cypriot government did not recognise any sovereignty that the Northern Cypriot administration may have and therefore do not allow international flights or free trade with the North. Discussions took place to try to remove these embargoes as it has been argued they violate the human rights of the citizens in the Northern areas. The Annan Plan for Cyprus, a United Nations proposal for reunification, was developed, calling for a referendum.

=== 21st century and the European Union membership (2004–present) ===
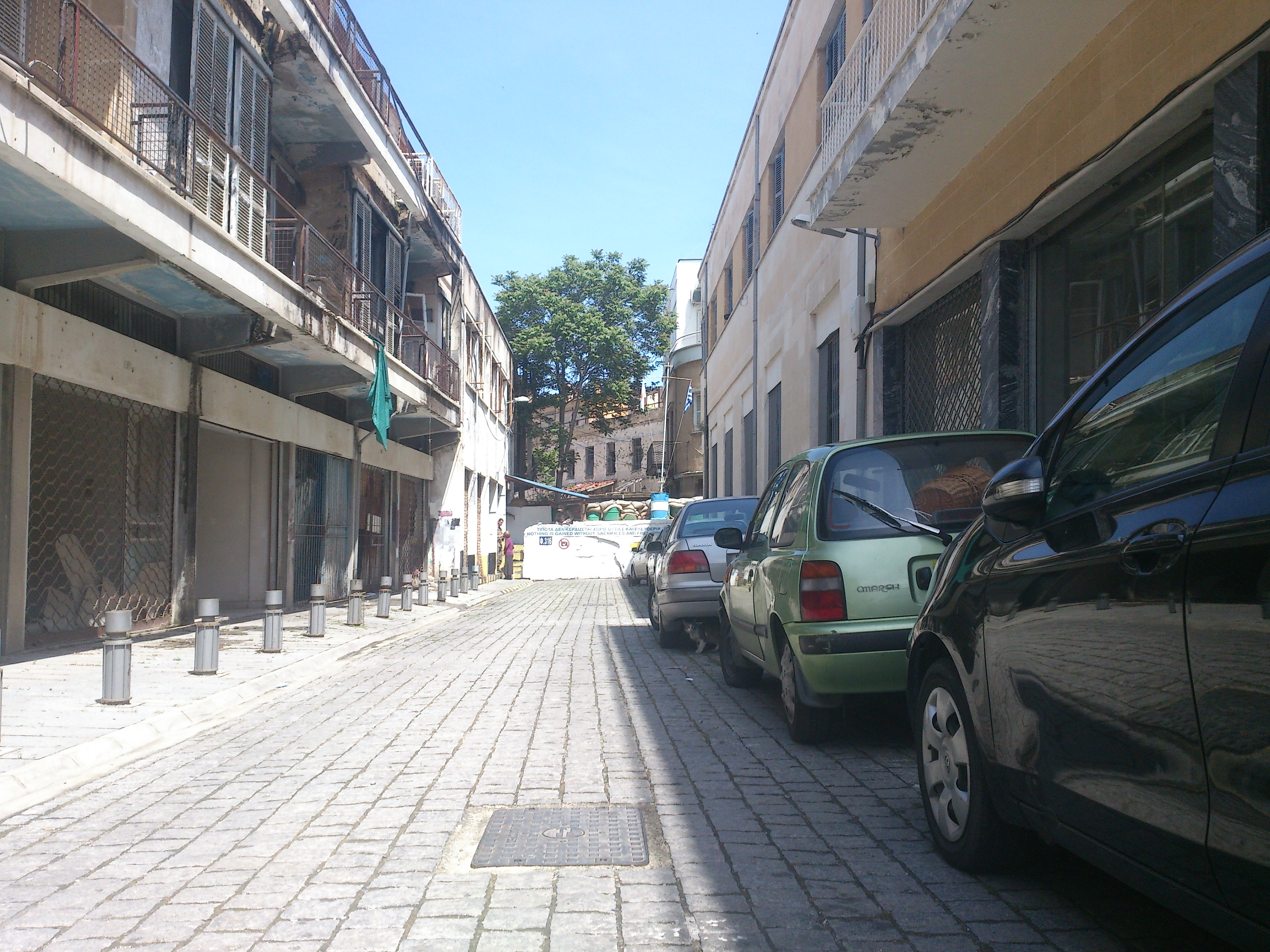
Street in Nicosia close to the buffer zone

Cyprus joined the European Union on 1 May 2004. Meanwhile, the negotiations about the status of the island grew. In December 2003, the United Nations Buffer Zone in Cyprus, between the two nations on Cyprus, was partly opened. Since then, members of both communities (and citizens of the EU) have been able to cross the buffer zone at the opened check points. In 2004, the planned UN-sponsored referendum on reunification was held on 21 April. Turkish Cypriots voted to accept the UN plan as stated in the referendum, but Greek Cypriots rejected it by a large majority.

On 1 January 2008, Cyprus joined the Eurozone, adopting the euro as its currency to replace the Cypriot pound.

The first elections to take place after Cyprus's accession to the European Union and the failed U.N. referendum were in 2008. Dimitris Christofias of the Progressive Party of Working People−AKEL, the communist party of Cyprus, became the president after defeating right-wing Ioannis Kasoulidis. Christofias started talks with Mehmet Ali Talat on the reunification of Cyprus as a bizonal federal state.

Renewed efforts between the North and the South, the 2014 Cyprus talks of the leaders of Greek and Turkish Cypriot communities, produced the unprecedented Joint Declaration for a negotiated settlement.

In 2013, Nicos Anastasiades of the conservative Democratic Rally, was elected as the President of Cyprus. In 2018, President Anastasiades was re-elected tor a second term with a wide margin over his communist opponent. On 28 February 2023, Nikos Christodoulides, the winner of the 2023 presidential election run-off, was sworn in as the eighth president of the Republic of Cyprus.

== See also ==
- Conquests of Cyprus
- History of Cyprus
- Timeline of Cypriot history
- Independence Day (Cyprus)
