= General Eyre (disambiguation) =

A General Eyre is a kind of medieval traveling judicial court. General Eyre may also refer to:

- James Eyre (British Army officer) (1930–2003), British Army major general
- Vincent Eyre (1811–1881), British Indian Army major general
- Wayne Eyre (fl. 1980s–2020s), Canadian Army general
- William Eyre (British Army officer) (1805–1859), British Army major general
