= Malcolm Stevenson =

British colonial administrator

Sir Malcolm Stevenson KCMG

Governor of Cyprus
- In office 10 March 1925 – 30 November 1926
- Monarch: George V
- Preceded by: Himself as High Commissioner
- Succeeded by: Sir Ronald Storrs

Governor of the Seychelles
- In office May 1927 – November 1927
- Monarch: George V
- Preceded by: Sir Joseph Aloysius Byrne
- Succeeded by: Louis Devaux (acting) de Symons Honey

Personal details
- Born: 15 March 1878 Lisburn, Ireland
- Died: 27 November 1927 (aged 49) Seychelles

Sir Malcolm Stevenson KCMG (15 March 1878 – 27 November 1927) was a British colonial administrator. He served as the Governor of Cyprus, and later as the Governor of the Seychelles.

Stevenson was born in Lisburn, Ireland, and educated at Methodist College Belfast and Trinity College Dublin, from which he graduated in 1901. He entered the Ceylon Civil Service in that year, rising to Second Assistant Colonial Secretary in May 1911. From December 1912 to October 1913 he was seconded to the Colonial Office in London, but then returned to Ceylon as private secretary to Governor Sir Robert Chalmers. In 1914 he married Chalmers's daughter, Mabel, and in 1915 he was promoted to Principal Assistant Colonial Secretary.

In May 1917, Stevenson was appointed Chief Secretary of Cyprus, in which post he administered the government from November 1918 to August 1920, when he was appointed High Commissioner. In May 1925, when Cyprus was given the status of a Crown Colony, he became the first Governor, holding the post until November 1926. In May 1927, he was appointed Governor of the Seychelles, but died suddenly just six months later.

Stevenson was appointed Companion of the Order of St Michael and St George (CMG) in the 1920 New Year Honours and Knight Commander of the Order of St Michael and St George (KCMG) in the 1923 Birthday Honours.

He died on 27 November 1927 in the Seychelles.
