= Turkish Cypriot nationalism =

Turkish Cypriot nationalism, also known as Cypriot Turkism, is a form of ethnic nationalism emphasising the Turkishness of the Cypriot nation. It supports the independence of the Turkish Republic of Northern Cyprus (TRNC) and mostly desires that the TRNC stay independent from Turkey while opposing the idea of a united Cyprus with the Greek-dominated Republic of Cyprus. The objective of taksim, that is, the partition of the island of Cyprus into Turkish and Greek portions, is widespread among Turkish Cypriot nationalists. Nevertheless, a considerable number of them wish for Turkey to annex the whole island of Cyprus.

== History ==
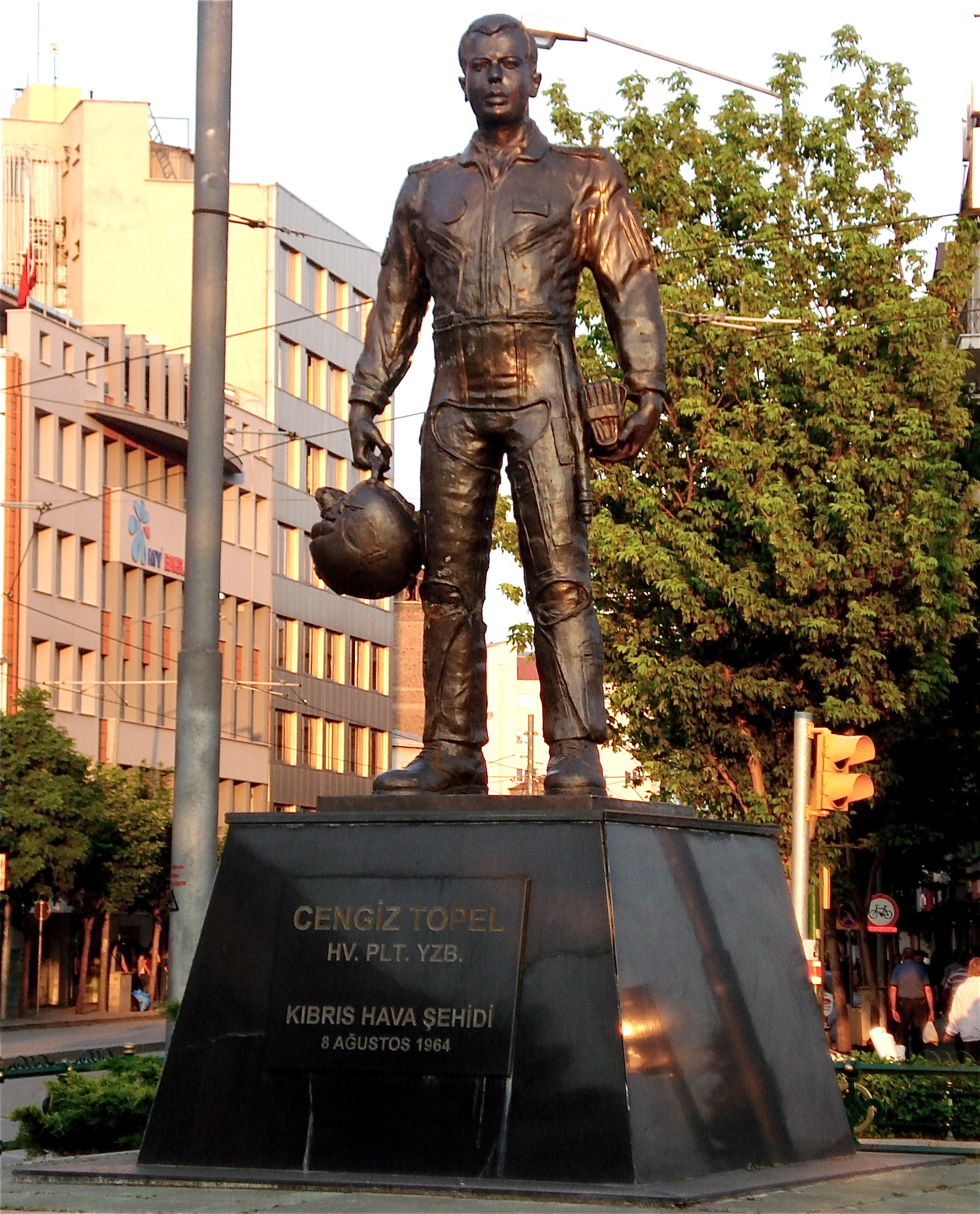
Statue of Turkish pilot, Cengiz Topel in Eskişehir, Turkey. Topel was one of the pilots sent by Turkey to bomb Greek positions in Kokkina in August 1964. He was captured and tortured to death there. Topel is an important symbol of Turkish nationalism in Cyprus, and he is known as the "first martyr of Cyprus" in Turkey and Northern Cyprus.

In 1950s and 1960s, Turkish Cypriot nationalism developed mainly in response to Greek and Greek Cypriot nationalism and their desire for enosis, union of the whole island with Greece. Initially, Turkish Cypriots favoured the continuation of British rule. However, they were alarmed by the Greek Cypriot calls for enosis, as they saw that the union of Crete with Greece had led to the exodus of Cretan Turks, which was a precedent to be avoided, and they took a pro-partition stance in response to the militant activity of the EOKA. The slogan "Either Taksim or Death" was frequently used in Turkish Cypriot and Turkish protests in the late 1950s and throughout the 1960s. Although after the Zurich and London Conferences, Turkey seemed both to accept the existence of the Cypriot state and to distance itself from its policy of favouring the partition of the island, the goal of Turkish and Turkish Cypriot leaders remained that of creating an independent Turkish state in the northern part of the island.

On 6 August 1964, units of the Cypriot National Guard and Turkish Cypriot armed groups started to clash near Kokkina. On 8 August 1964, after waiting for nearly two days, Turkey intervened, once it had become clear that the Greek Cypriots would not withdraw from Kokkina, but simply commit more and more siege forces until the Turkish Cypriots ran out of supplies. The incident was an important turning point in both Turkish and Turkish Cypriot nationalism, and it caused a massive increase in nationalist opinions among the Turkish Cypriots. This increase was mostly in favour of idea of Turkish annexation of Cyprus.

On 20 July 1974, Turkey launched an invasion of the island following a Greek Junta sponsored coup d'état against President Makarios, aimed at uniting the island with Greece. The second Turkish offensive, codenamed "Attila 2", took place between 14 and 18 August 1974 and extended as far west as the Kokkina enclave.

== See also ==
- Cypriot nationalism
- Greek Cypriot nationalism
- Turkish nationalism
- Turkish invasion of Cyprus
