= Taksim (politics) =

Nationalist ideology among Turkish Cypriots

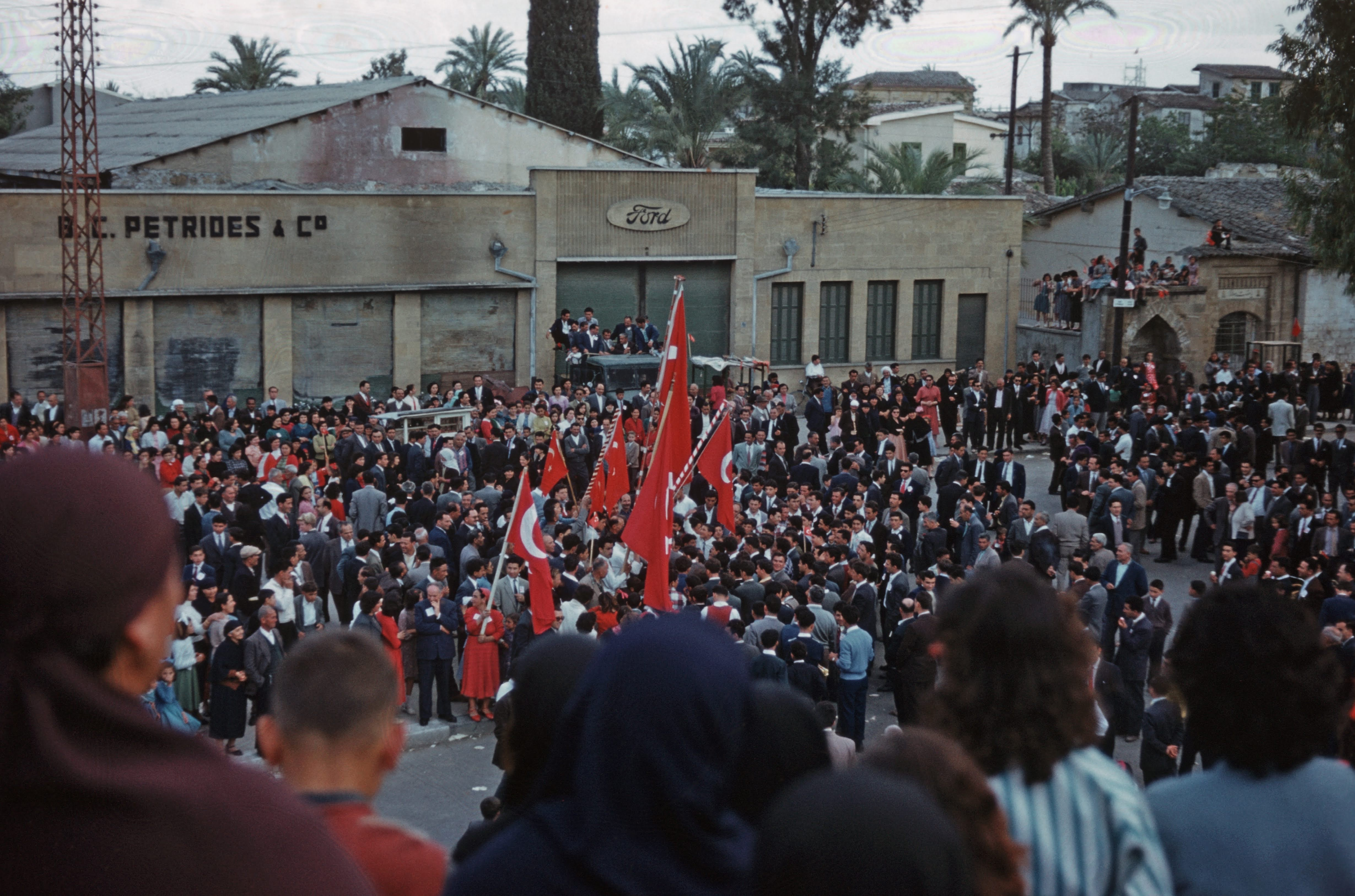
Turkish independence rally in Nicosia on 28 January 1958

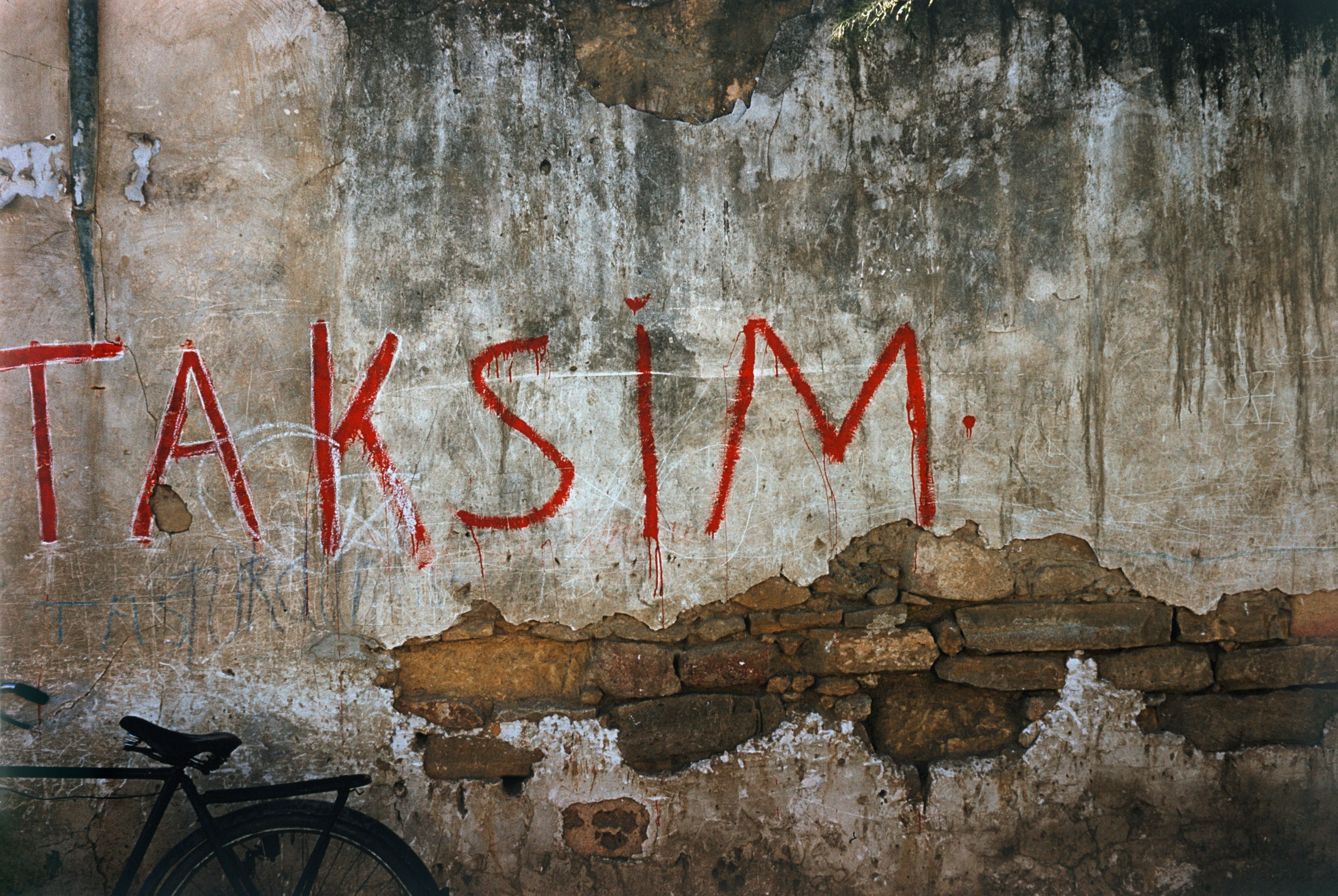
"TAKSİM" graffiti on a wall in Nicosia in the late 1950s

Taksim (Turkish: [takˈsim], lit. 'division') is a Turkish Cypriot nationalist and secessionist movement of Turkish Cypriots advocating for the independence and recognition of the Turkish Republic of Northern Cyprus under a two-state solution. It was the primary ideology of supporters of the 1974 invasion, with the concept being articulated as early as 1957 by Vice President Fazıl Küçük.

Turkish Cypriot nationalism developed mainly in response to Greek nationalism and the desire for enosis, union of the whole island with Greece. Initially, Turkish Cypriots favoured the continuation of British rule. However, they were alarmed by the Greek Cypriot calls for enosis, as they saw that the union of Crete with Greece had led to the exodus of Cretan Turks, which was a precedent to be avoided, and they took a pro-partition stance in response to the militant activity of EOKA. Turkish Cypriots also viewed themselves as a distinct ethnic group of the island and believed in their having a separate right to self-determination from Greek Cypriots. Meanwhile, in the 1950s, Turkish leader Adnan Menderes considered Cyprus an "extension of Anatolia", rejected the partition of Cyprus along ethnic lines and supported the annexation of the whole island to Turkey. Nationalistic slogans centred on the idea that "Cyprus is Turkish", and the ruling party declared Cyprus to be part of the Turkish homeland and vital for its security. Upon realising that Turkish Cypriots were only 20% of the islanders and so annexation was unfeasible, the national policy was changed to favour partition. The slogan "Partition or Death" was frequently used in Turkish Cypriot and Turkish protests in the late 1950s and throughout the 1960s. Although after the Zurich and London Conferences, Turkey seemed both to accept the existence of the Cypriot state and to distance itself from its policy of favouring the partition of the island, the goal of Turkish and Turkish Cypriot leaders remained that of creating an independent Turkish state in the northern part of the island. In the 21st century, the Turkish president Recep Tayyip Erdoğan has expressed support for a two-state solution.

== See also ==
- Cyprus problem
- Megali Idea
- Republic of Cyprus
- Turkish Republic of Northern Cyprus
- Turkish Cypriot nationalism
