= Robert Thomson (British Army officer) =

British Army general (born 1967)

Major General Robert Thomson CBE DSO
- Born: 1 January 1967 (age 59)
- Military career
- Allegiance: United Kingdom
- Branch: British Army
- Service years: 1988–2022
- Rank: Major General
- Commands: British Forces Cyprus; 38th (Irish) Brigade; 2nd Battalion The Rifles
- Conflicts: Iraq War; War in Afghanistan
- Awards: Commander of the Order of the British Empire; Distinguished Service Order; Bronze Star Medal (United States)

Major General Robert John Thomson, CBE, DSO (born 1 January 1967) is a former senior British Army officer. He served as Commander of British Forces Cyprus between September 2019 and August 2022.

== Military career ==
He was educated at Brentwood School, Essex, Magdalene College, Cambridge and King's College London (MA Defence Studies). Thomson was commissioned into the Royal Green Jackets on 2 September 1988. He served as commanding officer of 2nd Battalion The Rifles and was deployed in that role on Operation Herrick 10 in Afghanistan from May 2009 to October 2009. He went on to be commander of 38th (Irish) Brigade in December 2011 and Deputy Commander of Regional Command Southwest in April 2014, in which role he led the withdrawal of British troops from Camp Bastion in October 2014. He became British defence attaché in Paris in September 2017, and commander of British Forces Cyprus in September 2019.

Thomson was appointed a Member of the Order of the British Empire in the 2005 New Year Honours, and advanced to Commander of the Order of the British Empire for services in Afghanistan on 3 July 2015.

Military offices
Preceded by James Illingworth	Commander British Forces Cyprus; 2019–2022	Succeeded by Peter Squires
