= James Illingworth =

British Army general

Major General James Illingworth OBE
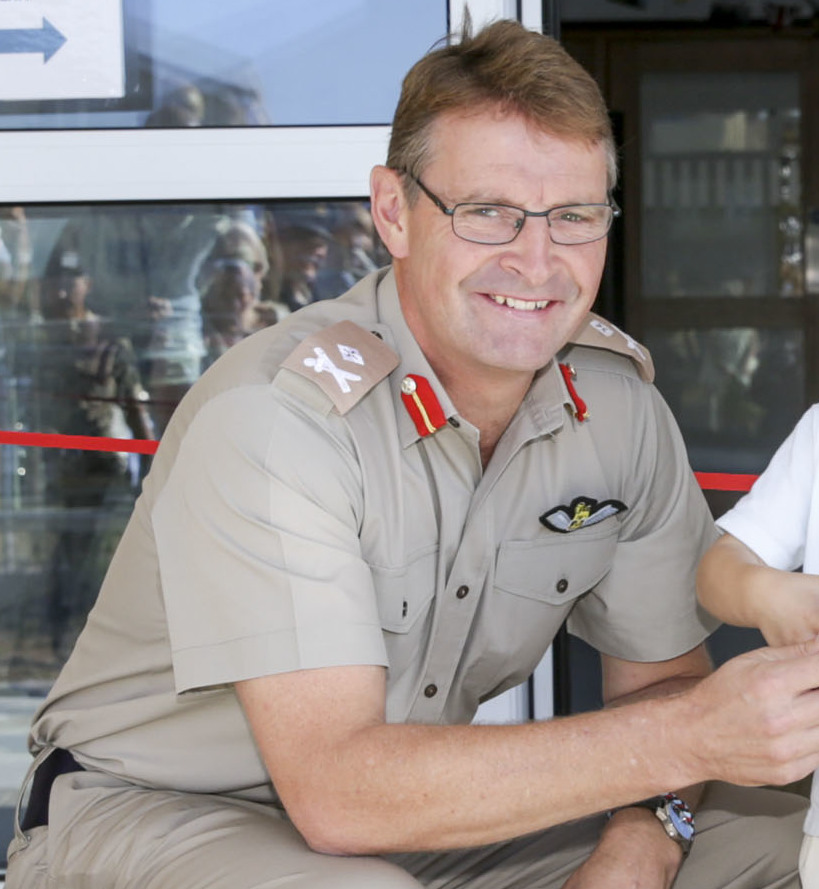
- Illingworth in 2017
- Military career
- Allegiance: United Kingdom
- Branch: British Army
- Service years: 1989–2022
- Rank: Major General
- Commands: British Forces Cyprus; No. 657 Squadron AAC
- Conflicts: Iraq War; War in Afghanistan
- Awards: Officer of the Order of the British Empire

Major General James Timothy Edward Illingworth, OBE is a former senior British Army officer. He served as Commander of British Forces Cyprus from 2017 to 2019.

== Military career ==
Educated at Wellington College, Berkshire, and the University of Leicester, Illingworth was commissioned into the Army Air Corps in 1989. He became commanding officer of No. 657 Squadron AAC in August 2001 and went on to be a staff officer in the Directorate of Joint Commitments at the Ministry of Defence in 2003, Deputy Commander, Joint Helicopter Command in December 2010 and senior military attaché at the British Defence Staff – US in Washington, D.C. in August 2013.

llingworth became Deputy Commander, 1st (United Kingdom) Division in August 2016 and Commander, British Forces Cyprus in February 2017. He was replaced by Major General Robert Thomson on 25 September 2019. Illingworth was appointed Director Land Warfare Centre in October 2019. He retired in April 2022.

Illingworth was appointed an Officer of the Order of the British Empire in the 2008 New Year Honours.

Military offices
Preceded by Michael Wigston	Commander British Forces Cyprus; 2017–2019	Succeeded by Robert Thomson
