= Desmond Langley =

British Army general (1930–2008)

Major-General Sir Desmond Langley KCVO MBE
- Born: 16 May 1930; London, England
- Died: 14 February 2008 (aged 77)
- Military career
- Allegiance: United Kingdom
- Branch: British Army
- Service years: 1949–1988
- Rank: Major-General
- Service number: 407937
- Unit: Life Guards
- Commands: British Forces Cyprus; London District; Household Division; 4th Guards Armoured Brigade; Household Cavalry Regiment
- Conflicts: Indonesia–Malaysia confrontation
- Awards: Knight Commander of the Royal Victorian Order; Member of the Order of the British Empire

Major-General Sir Henry Desmond Allen Langley, KCVO, MBE (16 May 1930 – 14 February 2008) was a senior British Army officer who served as Major-General commanding the Household Division and General Officer Commanding London District from 1979 to 1983. He later served as the 132nd Governor of Bermuda from 1988 to 1992.

== Military career ==
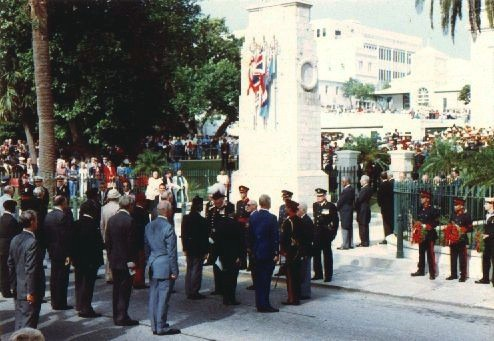
Remembrance Day parade in Hamilton, Bermuda, 1990. Langley, as governor, inspects war veterans and is speaking with former second-in-command of the Royal Bermuda Regiment Major Bob Burns.

Educated at Eton College and the Royal Military Academy Sandhurst, Langley was commissioned into the Life Guards in 1949. He was posted to Egypt and then to Libya. He then served with HQ Far East Land Forces during the Indonesia–Malaysia confrontation in the early 1960s. He later became commanding officer of the Household Cavalry Regiment and Silver Stick to Queen Elizabeth II. In 1976 he was appointed commander of the 4th Guards Armoured Brigade and in 1978 he became a brigadier on the General Staff at UK Land Forces.

Langley became Major-General commanding the Household Division and General Officer Commanding London District in 1979, organising, inter alia, the military ceremony for the marriage of the Prince Charles and Princess Diana. His final appointment was as commander of British Forces Cyprus and Administrator of the Sovereign Base Areas in 1983, before retiring in 1988.

== Later life ==
In retirement Langley was civil Governor and military Commander-in-Chief of Bermuda from 1988 to 1992, taking particular interest in the Bermuda Regiment (now the Royal Bermuda Regiment) and hosting summit meetings in Bermuda between Prime Minister Margaret Thatcher and US President George H. W. Bush, and then between Prime Minister John Major and Bush.

Among the mourners who attended Langley's funeral at St Luke's Church in Milland on 10 March 2008 were two former commanding officers of the Bermuda Regiment, Lieutenant Colonel Alan Rance and Lieutenant Colonel David Burch, as well as two of Langley's three aides-de-camp from the Bermuda Regiment, Major William Madeiros and Captain Larry Mussenden.

== Family ==
In 1950 Langley married Felicity Oliphant; the couple had a son and a daughter.

Military offices
Preceded by Sir John Swinton	GOC London District; 1979–1983	Succeeded by Sir James Eyre
Preceded by Robert Davis	Commander British Forces Cyprus; 1983–1985	Succeeded by Kenneth Hayr
Government offices
Preceded by Viscount Dunrossil	Governor of Bermuda; 1988–1992	Succeeded by Lord Waddington
