= Reynell Taylor (British Army officer) =

Major-General Reynell Taylor CB
- Born: 5 April 1928
- Died: 22 January 1996 (aged 67); Taunton Deane, Somerset, England
- Military career
- Allegiance: United Kingdom
- Branch: British Army
- Service years: 1948–1984
- Rank: Major-General
- Service number: 400085
- Unit: 4th/7th Royal Dragoon Guards
- Commands: 12th Armoured Brigade; British Forces Cyprus
- Awards: Companion of the Order of the Bath

Major-General Walter Reynell Taylor CB (5 April 1928 – 22 January 1996) was a British Army officer, who became commander of British Forces Cyprus.

== Early life ==
Taylor was born the son of Colonel Richard Reynell Taylor on 5 April 1928. He was educated at Wellington College, before moving on to Sandhurst.

== Military career ==
Taylor was commissioned into the 4th/7th Royal Dragoon Guards in December 1948, who were based at Sabratha in Libya. In 1957, he joined the Staff College at Camberley, followed by a two-year exchange appointment in Canada. On return from Canada, he returned to the staff college as an instructor, and on promotion to lieutenant-colonel in 1967, he joined the Defence Planning Staff in Singapore. In 1967 he moved to Germany to command his regiment; two years later, now a full colonel, he returned to the Staff College.

Taylor was promoted to brigadier and became commander of 12th Armoured Brigade in September 1972 at Osnabruck. In 1975 he attended the Royal College of Defence Studies in London before becoming deputy director of military operations at the Ministry of Defence in January 1976 and commander of British Forces Cyprus and Administrator of the Sovereign Base Areas in May 1978. He went on to be Chief of Staff for British Army of the Rhine in December 1980 before retiring in January 1984.

Taylor was appointed a Companion of the Order of the Bath in the 1981 Birthday Honours.

== Later life ==
Taylor left the Army in 1984 and became director of the Middle East Training Centre in Nicosia, Cyprus before returning to Somerset, England, in 1987, where he bought a farm. Taylor then became involved as a consultant in the concrete industry and later spent time in the Middle East involved in a technology transfer programme for concrete batching plants as part of the Al-Yamamah arms deal.

== Family life ==
Taylor married Doreen Dodge in 1954 and they had a son and a daughter; he remarried in 1982 to Rosemary Breed, with whom he had another son. Taylor died from heart failure on 22 January 1996; he was aged 67.

Military offices
Preceded by Roy Austen-Smith	Commander British Forces Cyprus; 1978–1980	Succeeded by Robert Davis
