= Alex Harley (British Army officer) =

British Army general (born 1941)

General Sir Alex Harley KBE CB
- Born: 3 May 1941 (age 85)
- Military career
- Allegiance: United Kingdom
- Branch: British Army
- Service years: 1962–2000
- Rank: General
- Commands: British Forces Cyprus; 33rd Armoured Brigade; 19th Regiment Royal Artillery
- Conflicts: The Troubles: Operation Banner
- Awards: Knight Commander of the Order of the British Empire; Companion of the Order of the Bath; Mentioned in Despatches

General Sir Alexander George Hamilton Harley, KBE, CB (born 3 May 1941) is a retired British Army officer and former Adjutant-General to the Forces.

== Military career ==
Educated at Caterham School, Alexander Harley was commissioned into the Royal Artillery in 1962. He was mentioned in despatches for services in Northern Ireland in 1978. He was appointed commanding officer of 19th Regiment Royal Artillery in 1979, Commander of 33rd Armoured Brigade in 1985 and Assistant Chief of Staff Operations for the Northern Army Group in 1988. He went on to be Assistant Chief of Defence Staff in 1990 and Commander of British Forces Cyprus and Administrator of the Sovereign Base Areas in 1993.

Harley became Deputy Chief of the Defence Staff (Commitments) in 1995 and Adjutant-General to the Forces in 1997 before he retired in August 2000. He was appointed an Officer of the Order of the British Empire in the 1981 Queen's Birthday Honours and a Companion of the Order of the Bath in the 1991 Queen's Birthday Honours.

== Retirement ==
In 2001 he became Master Gunner, St. James's Park, a post he gave up in 2008. In retirement he also became an advisor to Thales Air Systems and a vice-president of Raleigh International.

== Family ==
In 1967 he married Christina Valentine Butler-Cole and they went on to have two sons.

Military offices
Preceded by Sandy Hunter	Commander British Forces Cyprus; 1993–1995	Succeeded by Peter Millar
Preceded by Sir Nicholas Hill-Norton	Deputy Chief of the Defence Staff (Commitments); 1995–1997	Succeeded by Sir John Day
Preceded by Sir Michael Rose	Adjutant General; 1997–2000	Succeeded by Sir Timothy Granville-Chapman
Honorary titles
Preceded by Lord Vincent of Coleshill	Master Gunner, St. James's Park; 2001–2008	Succeeded by Sir Timothy Granville-Chapman
Preceded by Sir Michael Wilkes	Colonel Commandant and President, Honourable Artillery Company; 1998–2003	Succeeded by Sir Timothy Granville-Chapman
