= Robert Davis (RAF officer) =

Air Vice-Marshal Robert Davis CB
- Born: 22 March 1930 (age 96)
- Military career
- Allegiance: United Kingdom
- Branch: Royal Air Force
- Service years: 1952–1983
- Rank: Air Vice-Marshal
- Commands: British Forces Cyprus (1980–83); RAF Leuchars (1975–77); No. 19 Squadron RAF (1970–72)
- Awards: Companion of the Order of the Bath

Air Vice-Marshal Robert Leslie Davis, CB (born 22 March 1930) is a former Royal Air Force officer who served as Commander British Forces Cyprus from 1980 to 1983.

== RAF career ==
Educated at Wolsingham Grammar School and the Bede School, Davis joined the Royal Air Force (RAF) in 1952. He became officer commanding No. 19 Squadron RAF in 1970, Deputy Director Operations (Air Defence) at the Ministry of Defence in 1972 and Station Commander at RAF Leuchars in 1975. He went on to be air attaché in Washington, D.C. in 1977 and Commander British Forces Cyprus and Administrator of the Sovereign Base Areas in 1980 before retiring in 1983.

Military offices
Preceded by Reynell Taylor	Commander British Forces Cyprus; 1980–1983	Succeeded by Sir Desmond Langley
