= 1950 Cypriot enosis referendum =

- 15–22 January 1950
- [_] We demand the union with Greece [_] We are against the union of Cyprus with Greece

Results
Choice	Votes	%
For union with Greece	215,108	95.71%
Against union with Greece	9,639	4.29%
Valid votes	224,747	100.00%
Invalid or blank votes	0	0.00%
Total votes	224,747	100.00%
Registered voters/turnout	250,000	89.9%

An unofficial referendum on enosis (reunification) with Greece was held in British Cyprus between 15 and 22 January 1950. The vote was not sanctioned by the British authorities. Only Greek Cypriots voted, and the proposal was approved by 95.71% of those taking part; the result was never implemented.

== Background ==
On 12 December 1949 Archbishop Makarios II had called on the British authorities to hold a referendum on the future of the island. After they refused, the Church Council and the Enosis organisation organised a referendum. Signature books were provided in churches between 15 and 22 January 1950. The books had two columns, entitled "We demand union with Greece" and "We are against the union of Cyprus with Greece".

== Results ==
Choice	Votes	%
For	215,108	95.71
Against	9,639	4.29
Total	224,747	100.00
Source: Direct Democracy

== Aftermath ==
After the referendum, the Church of Cyprus publicly admonished those who had voted against enosis. In the latter years of British rule in Cyprus, the Church sought to silence dissenting opinion among Greek Cypriots, sometimes by violent means.

In February 2017 the Cypriot parliament voted in favour of commemorating the referendum in schools every year. The decision was received negatively by Turkish Cypriot politicians, causing talks between Cypriot President Nicos Anastasiades and the Turkish Cypriot leader Mustafa Akıncı to be halted. The bill was proposed by the National People's Front party (ELAM).
