= Peter Millar (RAF officer) =

Air Vice-Marshal Peter Millar CB
- Born: 20 June 1942 (age 84)
- Military career
- Allegiance: United Kingdom
- Branch: Royal Air Force
- Service years: 1964–1998
- Rank: Air Vice-Marshal
- Commands: British Forces Cyprus; RAF Wittering; No. 233 Operational Conversion Unit
- Awards: Companion of the Order of the Bath

Air Vice-Marshal Peter Millar, CB (born 20 June 1942) is a former Royal Air Force officer who served as Commander of British Forces Cyprus from 1995 to 1998.

== Career ==
Educated at Malvern College, Millar joined the Royal Air Force in 1964. He became commander at No. 233 Operational Conversion Unit in 1979, station commander at RAF Wittering in 1985 and a staff officer at the offices of the UK Military Representative to NATO in 1988. He went on to be a staff officer at the NATO Directorate within the Ministry of Defence in 1990, a staff officer at Headquarters Allied Air Forces Central Europe in 1993 and Commander British Forces Cyprus and Administrator of the Sovereign Base Areas in 1995 before retiring in 1998.

== Later life ==
In retirement Millar became Chairman of the Biotrans Consortium.

Military offices
| Preceded by Alexander Harley | Commander British Forces Cyprus; 1995–1998 | Succeeded by Angus Ramsay |
