= James Eyre (British Army officer) =

British Army general

Major-General Sir James Eyre KCVO CBE
- Born: 2 November 1930; London, England
- Died: 3 January 2003 (aged 72)
- Military career
- Allegiance: United Kingdom
- Branch: British Army
- Service years: 1955–1986
- Rank: Major-General
- Commands: London District; Household Division; Household Cavalry Regiment; Blues and Royals
- Conflicts: Cyprus Emergency; Operation Banner; Falklands War
- Awards: Knight Commander of the Royal Victorian Order; Commander of the Order of the British Empire; Mentioned in Despatches

Major-General Sir James Ainsworth Campden Gabriel Eyre, KCVO, CBE (2 November 1930 – 3 January 2003) was a senior British Army officer, who served as Major-General Commanding the Household Division and General Officer Commanding London District from 1983 until his retirement in 1986.

== Military career ==
Educated privately in the United States and at Harvard University, Eyre was commissioned into the Royal Horse Guards in 1955. He served in Cyprus and was mentioned in despatches for his role as an intelligence officer during the EOKA disturbances. He was appointed commanding officer of the Blues and Royals (RHG/D) in 1970. After serving as a General Staff Officer in London District from 1973 to 1975, he became commanding officer of the Household Cavalry Regiment and Silver Stick to Queen Elizabeth II.

In 1978, Eyre was posted to HQ Northern Ireland during The Troubles as a Senior Intelligence Officer, and sought to improve relations between the Royal Irish Constabulary and the British Army. In 1980 he was made Secretary to the Chiefs of Staff Committee at the Ministry of Defence, serving in that capacity there during the Falklands War, and in 1982 he became Director of Defence Programmes there. He was appointed Major-General commanding the Household Division and General Officer Commanding London District in 1983 and retired in 1986.

In retirement Eyre became a headhunter with Westminster Associates International.

== Family ==
In 1967 Eyre married Monica Smyth. They had a son and a daughter.

Military offices
Preceded by Sir Desmond Langley	GOC London District; 1983–1986	Succeeded by Sir Christopher Airy
