= Limassol =

City in Cyprus

Limassol Λεμεσός (Greek) Limasol (Turkish) Lemesos
- City and Municipal District
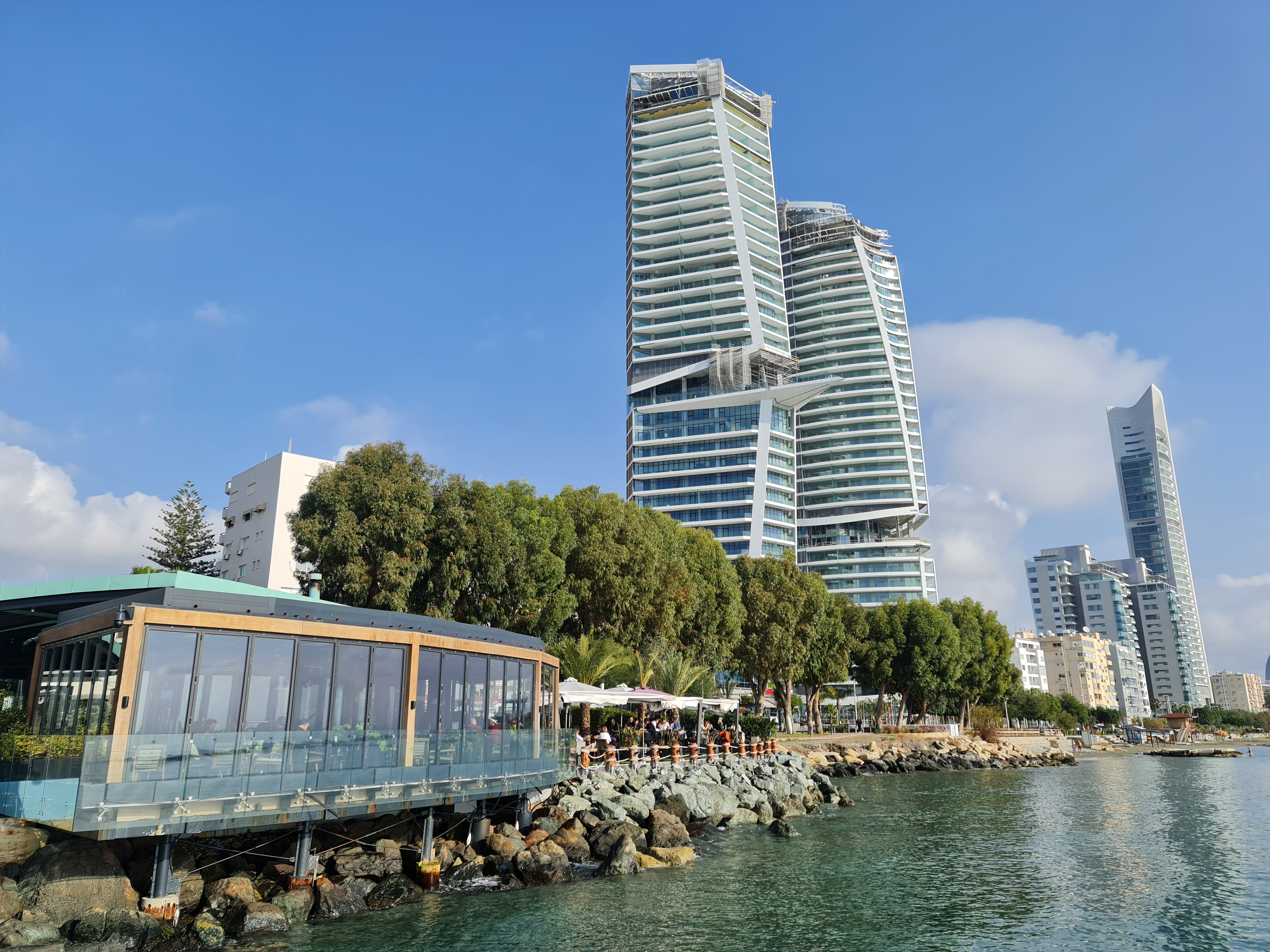
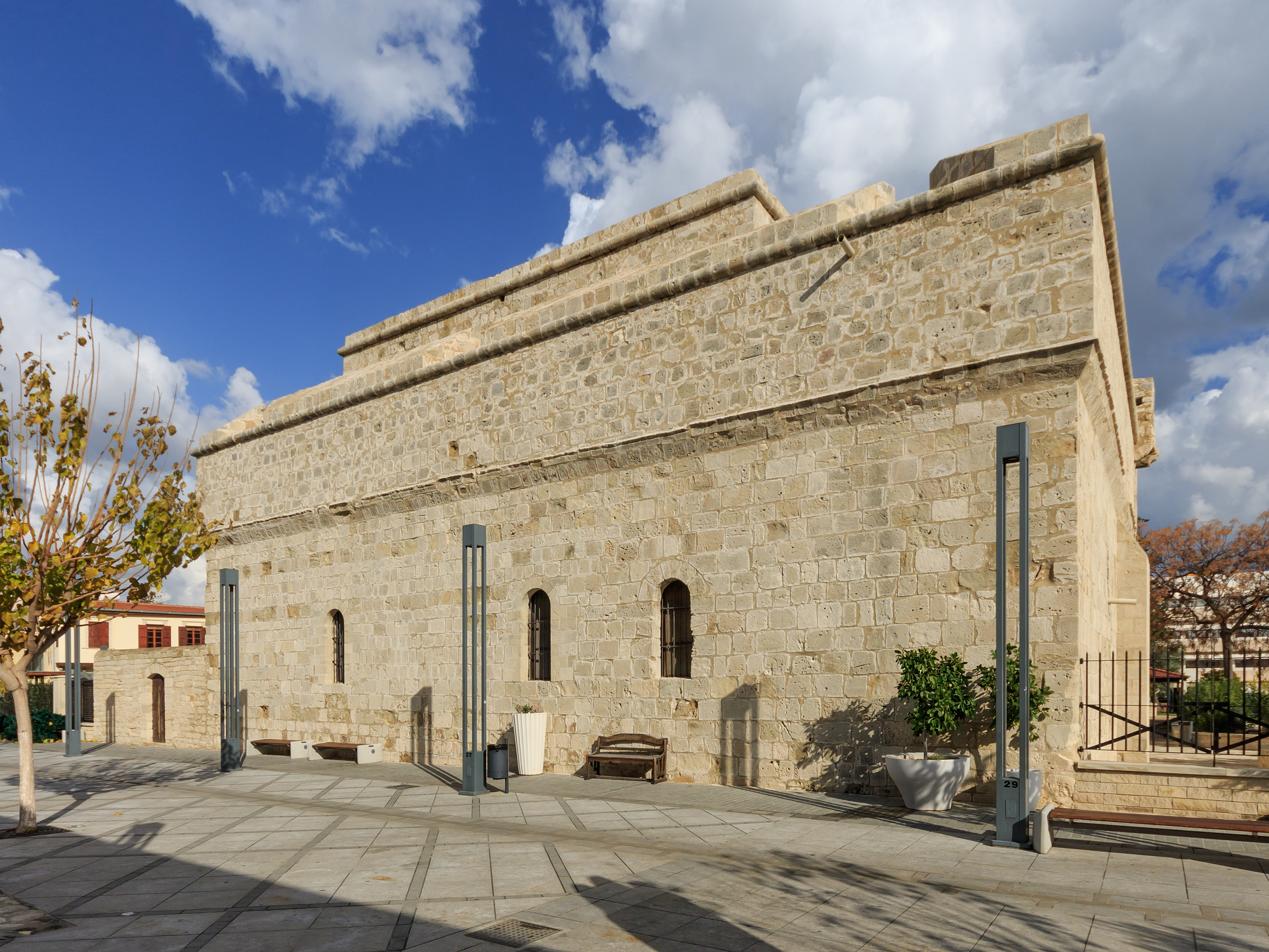
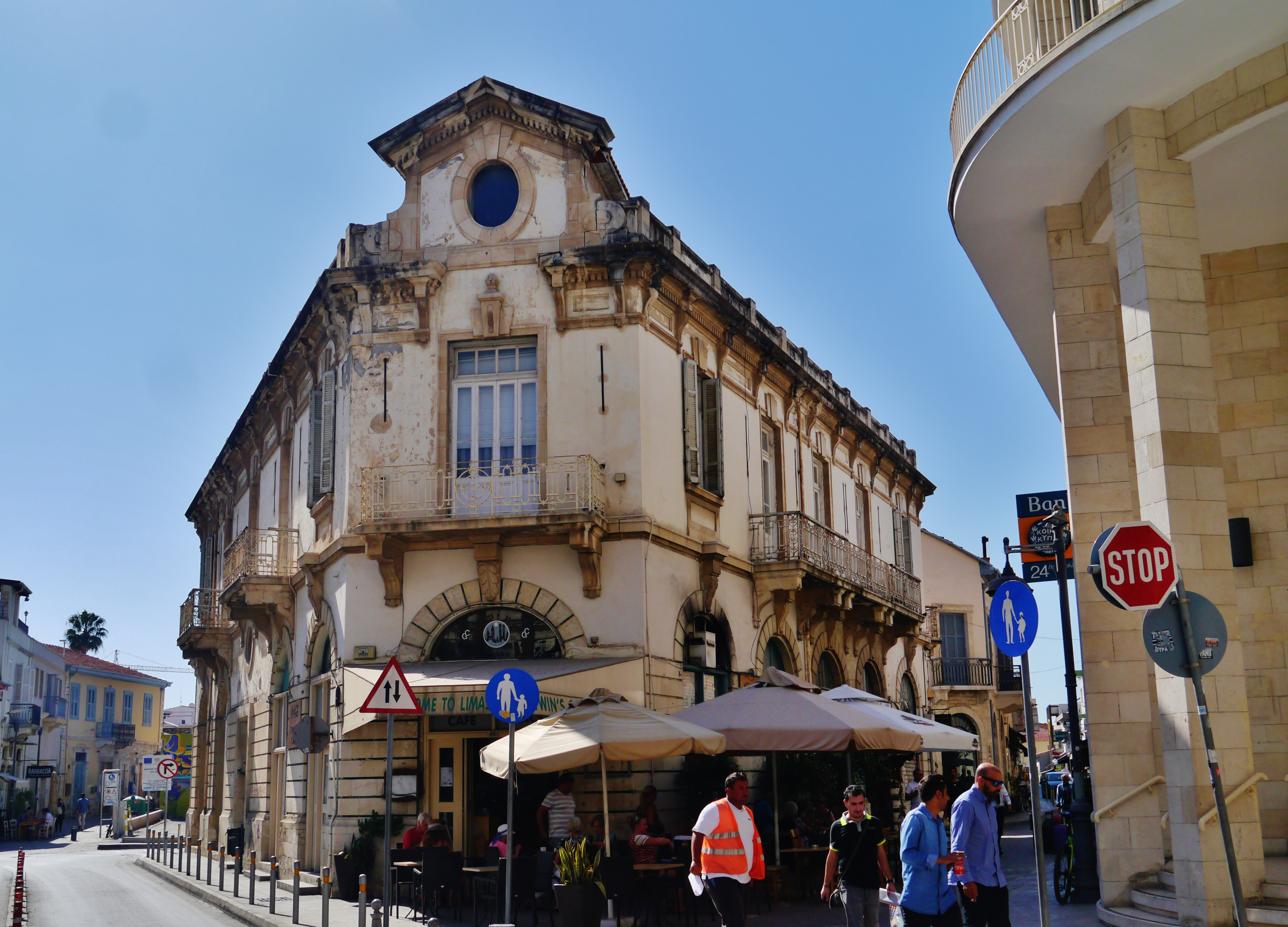
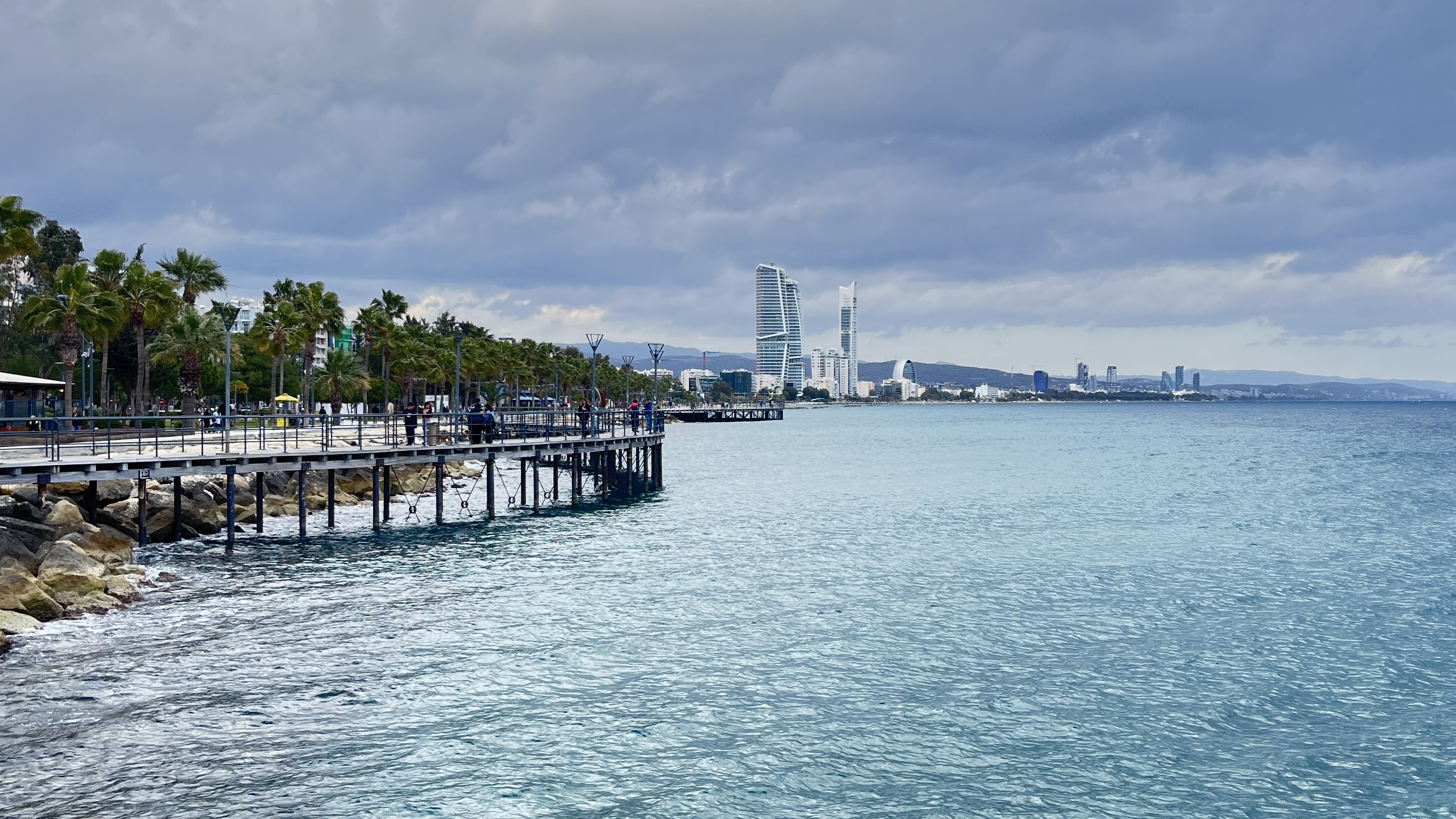
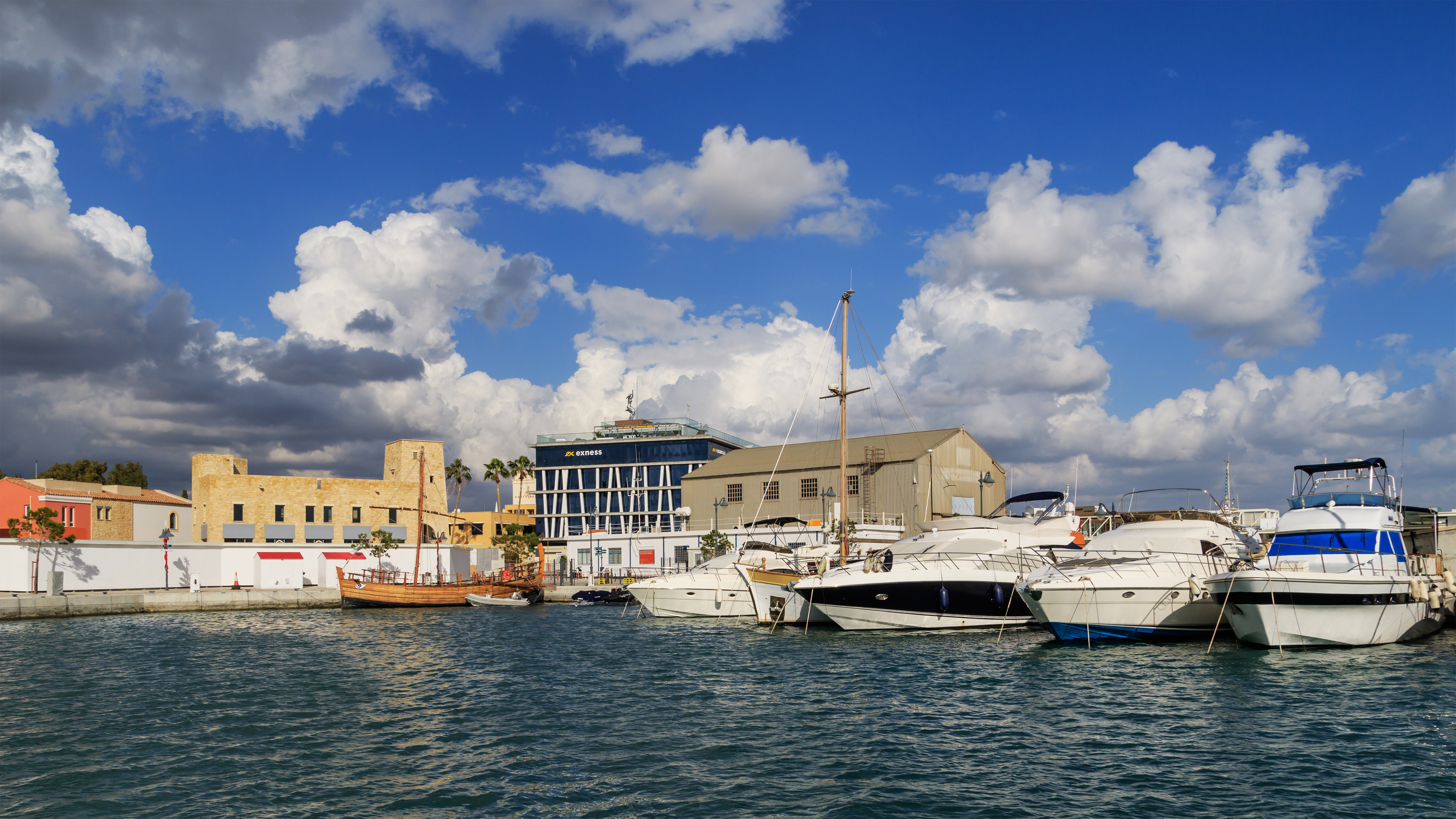
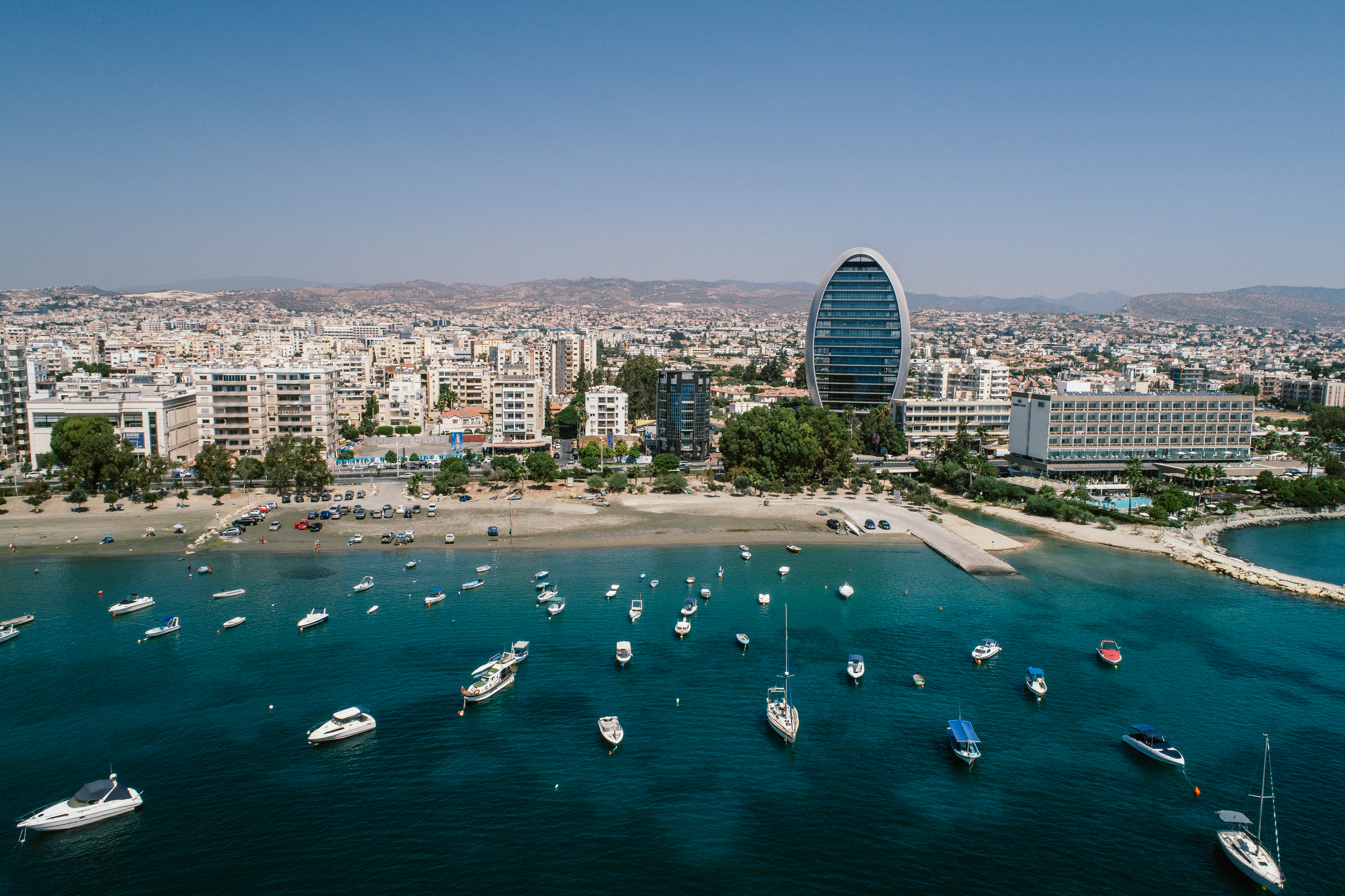
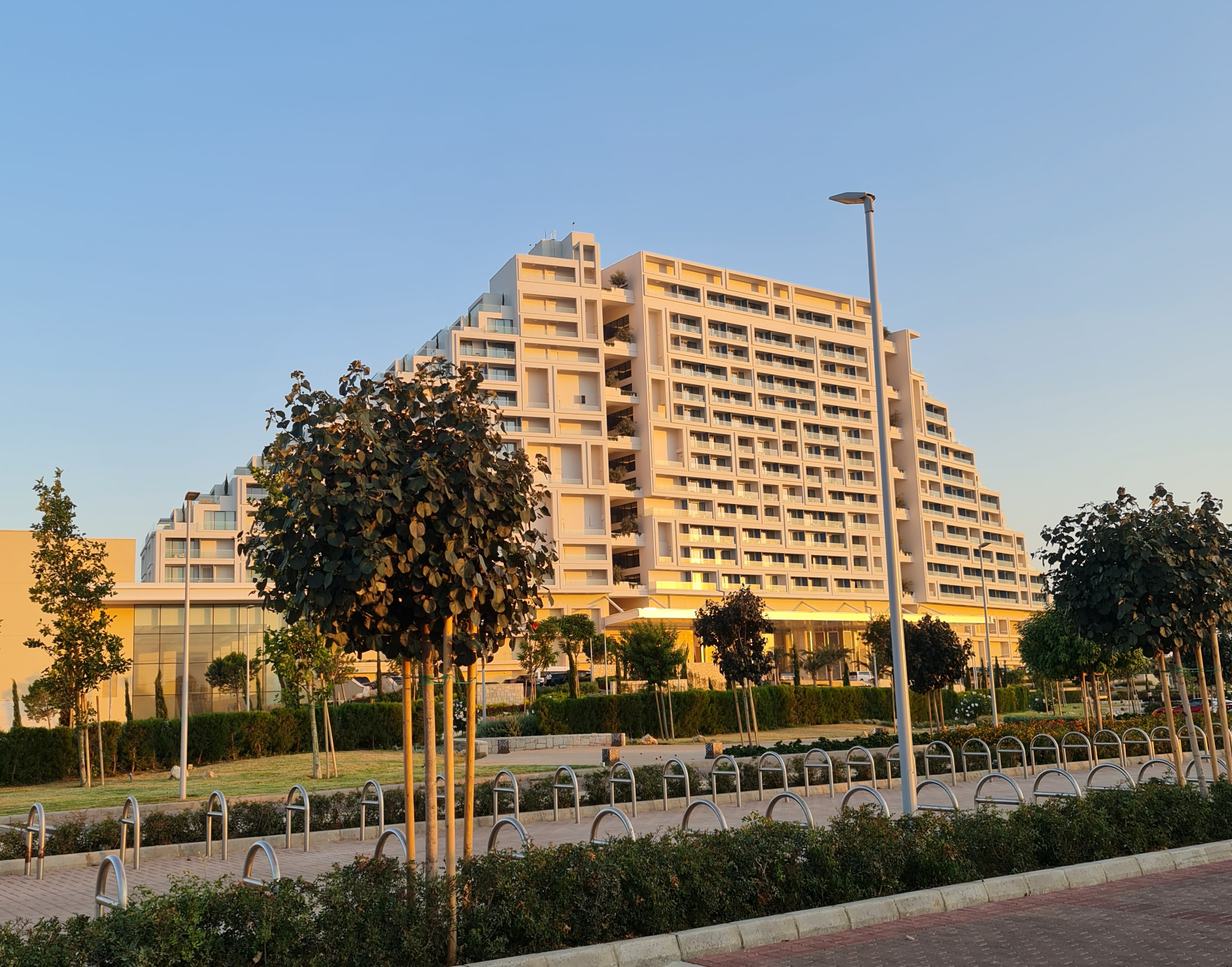
- Trilogy Towers (left) and ONE in the distance Limassol Castle Street in the Old Town Limassol Molos Limassol Marina The Oval City of Dreams

- Seal
- Interactive map of Limassol
- Location within Cyprus Location within the European Union
- Coordinates: 34°40′29″N 33°02′39″E
- Country: Cyprus
- District: Limassol District
- Municipality: Limassol Municipality

Government
  - Mayor: Yiannis Armeftis
  - Deputy Mayor: Demos Katsis

Area
  - Municipality: 35.09 km^{2} (13.55 sq mi)
  - Urban: 124.71 km^{2} (48.15 sq mi)

Population (2021)
  - Municipality: 108,105
  - Rank: 1st municipality, 2nd urban in Cyprus
  - Urban: 198,558
  - Urban density: 1,592.2/km^{2} (4,123.7/sq mi)
  - District: 262,238
- Demonym(s): Limassolian(s) (en) Lemesianos (masc.), Lemesiani (fem.) (gr)
- Time zone: UTC+2 (EET)
  - Summer (DST): UTC+3 (EEST)
- Post code: 3010–3150
- Area code: 25
- ISO 3166 code: CY-02
- Patron Saint: John the Merciful (12 November)
- Major port(s): Port of Limassol
- Website: www.limassol.org.cy

Limassol, (Note: /ˈlɪməsɒl/ LIM-ə-sol.) also known as Lemesos, (Note: Greek: Λεμεσός, romanized: Lemesós, IPA: [lemeˈsos], or dated Λεμησσός, Lemissós; Turkish: Limasol or dated Leymosun.) is a city on the southern coast of Cyprus. Limassol is the most populated municipality in Cyprus, with a population of 108,105 and is the second-largest urban area in Cyprus, after Nicosia, with an urban population of 198,558. It is the capital of the Limassol District with a population of 262,238.

Limassol was built between two ancient Greek cities, Amathus and Kourion. Its historical centre is located around the medieval Limassol Castle and the Old Port. The city spreads along the Mediterranean coast and extends beyond the castle and port, with its suburbs stretching along the coast to Amathus. To the west of the city is Akrotiri, part of the British Overseas Territory of Akrotiri and Dhekelia.

In 2014, Limassol was ranked by TripAdvisor as the third most up-and-coming destination in the world, in its Top 10 Travelers' Choice Destinations on the Rise list. In Mercer's Quality of Living Ranking, the city was ranked 90th in 2023, and 89th in 2017. In the 2022 GaWC ranking, Limassol was classified as a "high sufficiency" city, dropping one category from "gamma −" (lit. 'global city') in 2020.

== Etymology ==
The name "Limassol" derives from the ancient Greek word "Nemesos" (Greek: Νέμεσσος, romanized: Nemessos), meaning "one found in the middle". This likely refers to the city's location between the ancient towns of Amathus and Kourion. Over time, the name evolved into "Lemesos", which is known in English as "Limassol".

== History ==
=== Ancient ===
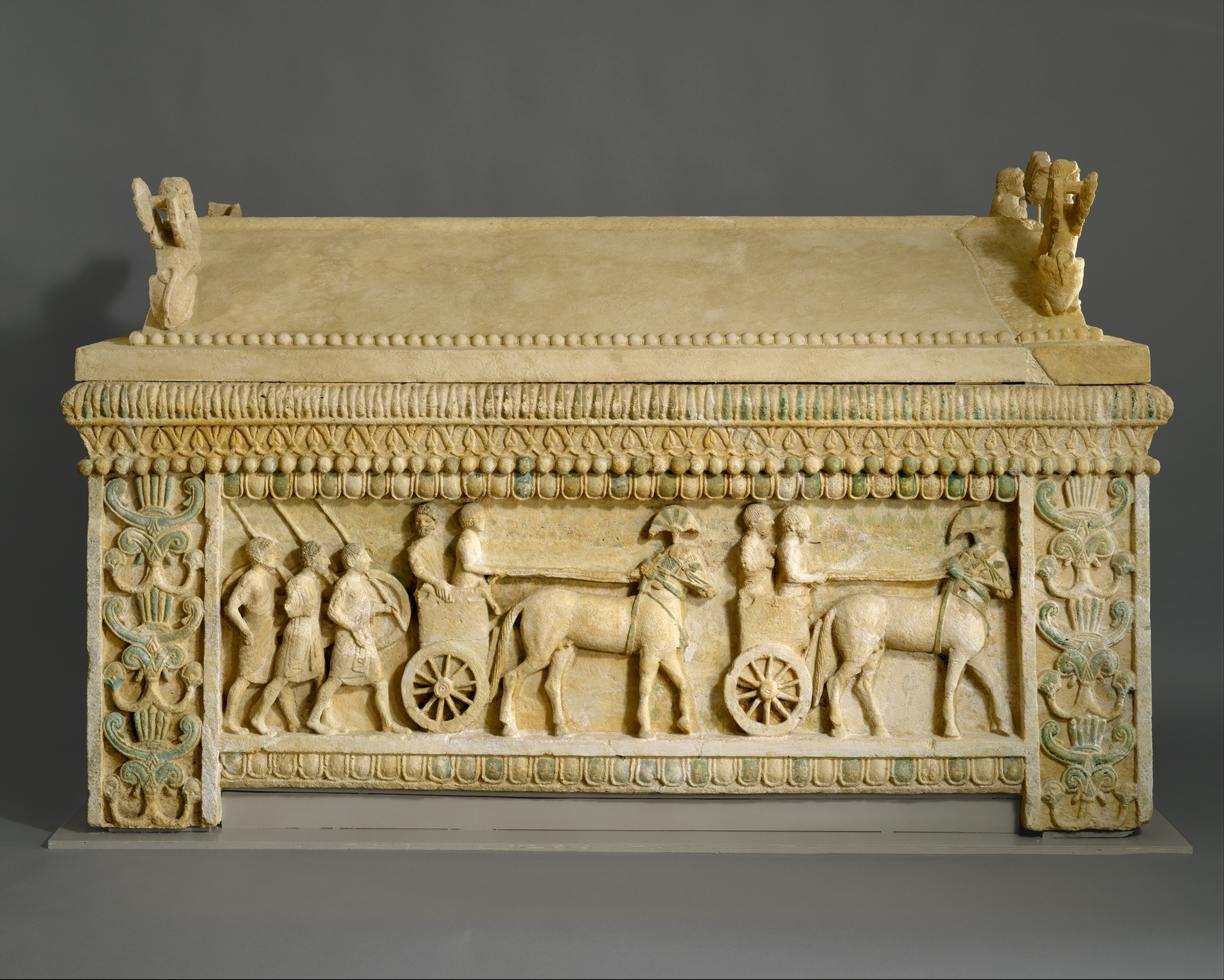
Limestone sarcophagus found in Amathus, dating to the 5th century BC

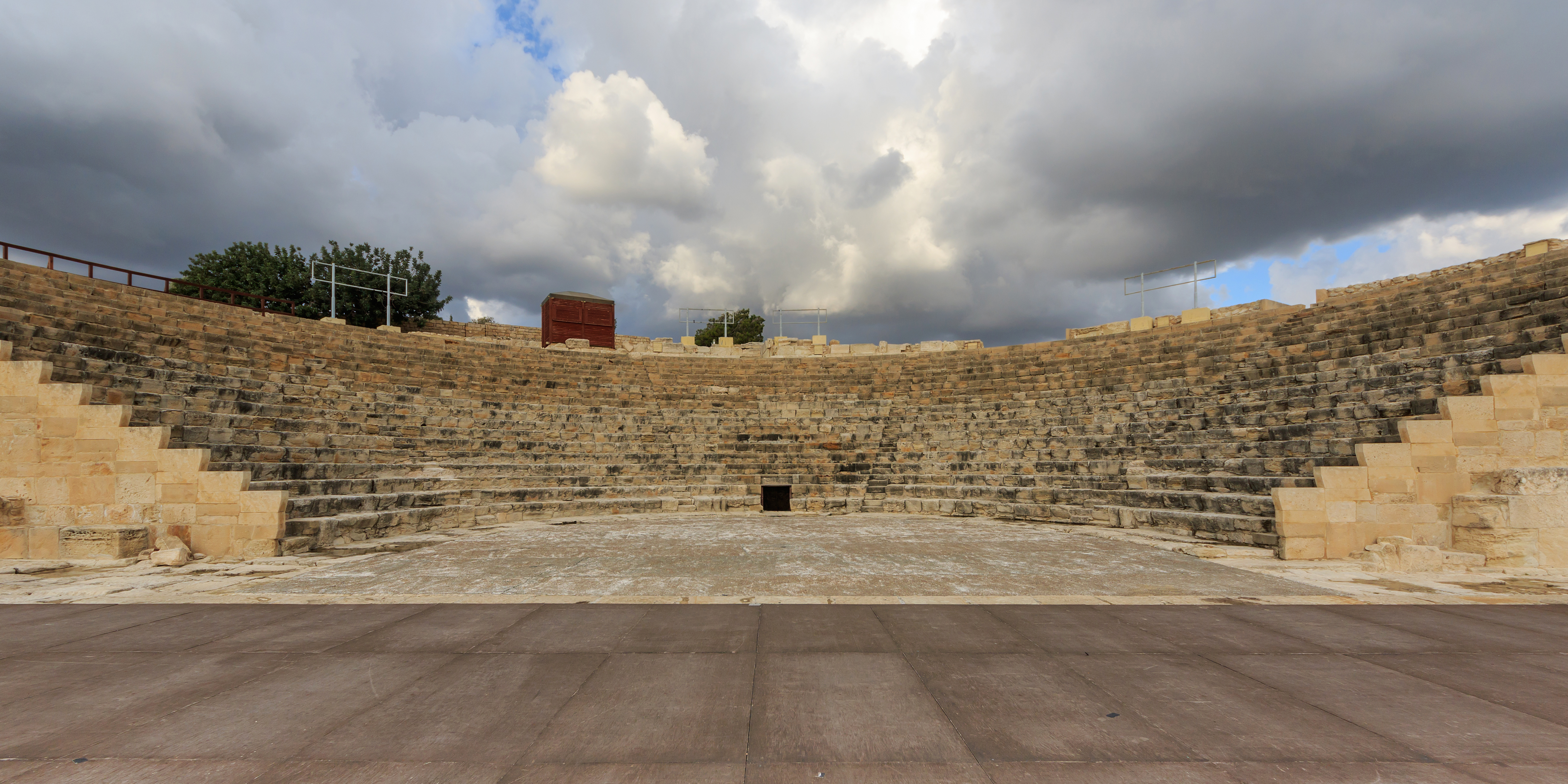
Kourion Theatre

Limassol is situated between the ancient city-kingdoms of Amathus, founded around 1100 BC by Greek settlers, and Kourion, founded around the same time. Settlements in the modern area of Limassol were most likely founded after the decline and destruction of Amathus, around the 7th century AD. The area around Limassol shows evidence of human activity dating back to the Neolithic period (around 7000 BC). Sites like Khirokitia indicate the presence of early farming communities in the area. During the Bronze Age, the region saw the development of more complex societies, with evidence of trade and cultural exchanges with neighbouring regions. Ancient writers and geographers do not mention the foundation of the town.

According to the Council of Chalcedon of 451, the local bishop as well as the bishops of Amathus and Arsinoe were involved establishing the city, which became known as Theodosiana and Neapolis. Bishop Leontios of Neapolis was an important church writer in the 7th century. The records of the 7th Synod (757) refer to it as the bishop's see. The town was known as Lemesos by the 10th century.

=== Medieval ===
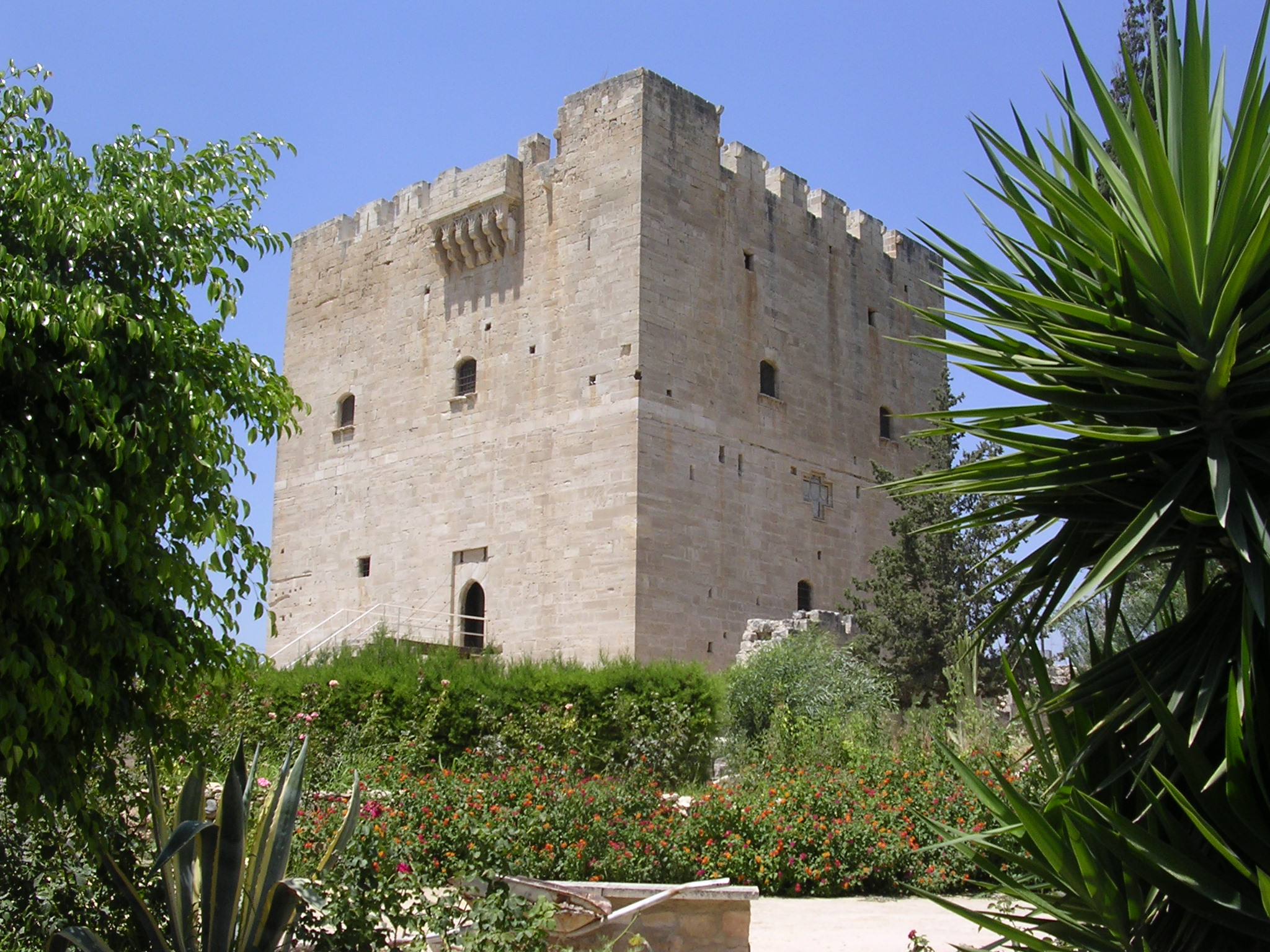
View of Kolossi Castle built in 1210 by the Frankish military.

The history of Limassol is bound up with the Third Crusade. The king of England, Richard the Lionheart, was travelling to the Holy Land in 1190. His fiancée, Berengaria, and his sister, Joan, were also travelling there, but on a different ship. Due to a storm, the women's ship arrived in Limassol. Isaac Komnenos, the renegade Byzantine governor of Cyprus, called the noblewomen ashore with the intention of holding them for ransom. When they refused he denied them fresh water and they had to put out to sea again. When Richard arrived in Limassol and met Isaac Komnenos, he asked him to contribute to the crusade. At first Isaac agreed but later refused. Richard took him captive and the entire island was taken over by the Anglo-Normans, bringing the long Byzantine dominion of Cyprus to an end. Richard celebrated his marriage with Berengaria who had received the crown as queen of England in Cyprus. Richard destroyed Amathus and the inhabitants were transferred to Limassol.

In 1191 Cyprus was sold for 100,000 bezants to the Knights Templar.

The knights imposed high taxes, to get back the money they had paid for Cyprus. This led to the revolt of the Cypriots, who wished to get rid of the bond of promise. Richard accepted their request and a new purchaser was found: Guy of Lusignan, a Roman Catholic from Poitou, who handed Cyprus over to the French house of Lusignan, thus establishing the medieval Kingdom of Cyprus.

For a period of about three centuries (1192–1489), Limassol enjoyed remarkable prosperity. Cyprus had a great number of Latin bishops, which lasted until the occupation of Cyprus by the Ottomans in 1570. The Latin battalions established monasteries and settled down there. The settlement of merchants in Cyprus and particularly in Limassol in the 13th century enhanced the welfare of its inhabitants. Its harbour became a centre of transportation and commerce, contributing greatly to its financial and cultural development.

=== Venetian rule ===
In 1489 Cyprus was sold to Venice by the Cypriot queen Catherine Cornaro. The Venetians were not interested in Cyprus and only wanted to tax and exploit the island's resources. All the inhabitants were enslaved by the Venetians, and were obliged to give a third of their income, including products of the land. Travelers who visited Cyprus in the 16th century commented on the poor condition of the local population in the towns of the island.

In 1538 the Ottomans captured the city and Limassol Castle. The Venetian governor of Cyprus, after recapturing the castle, decided to demolish it to avoid its possible seizure. This destruction was completed in 1567–1568. Two years later the Ottomans recaptured the city.

=== Ottoman rule ===
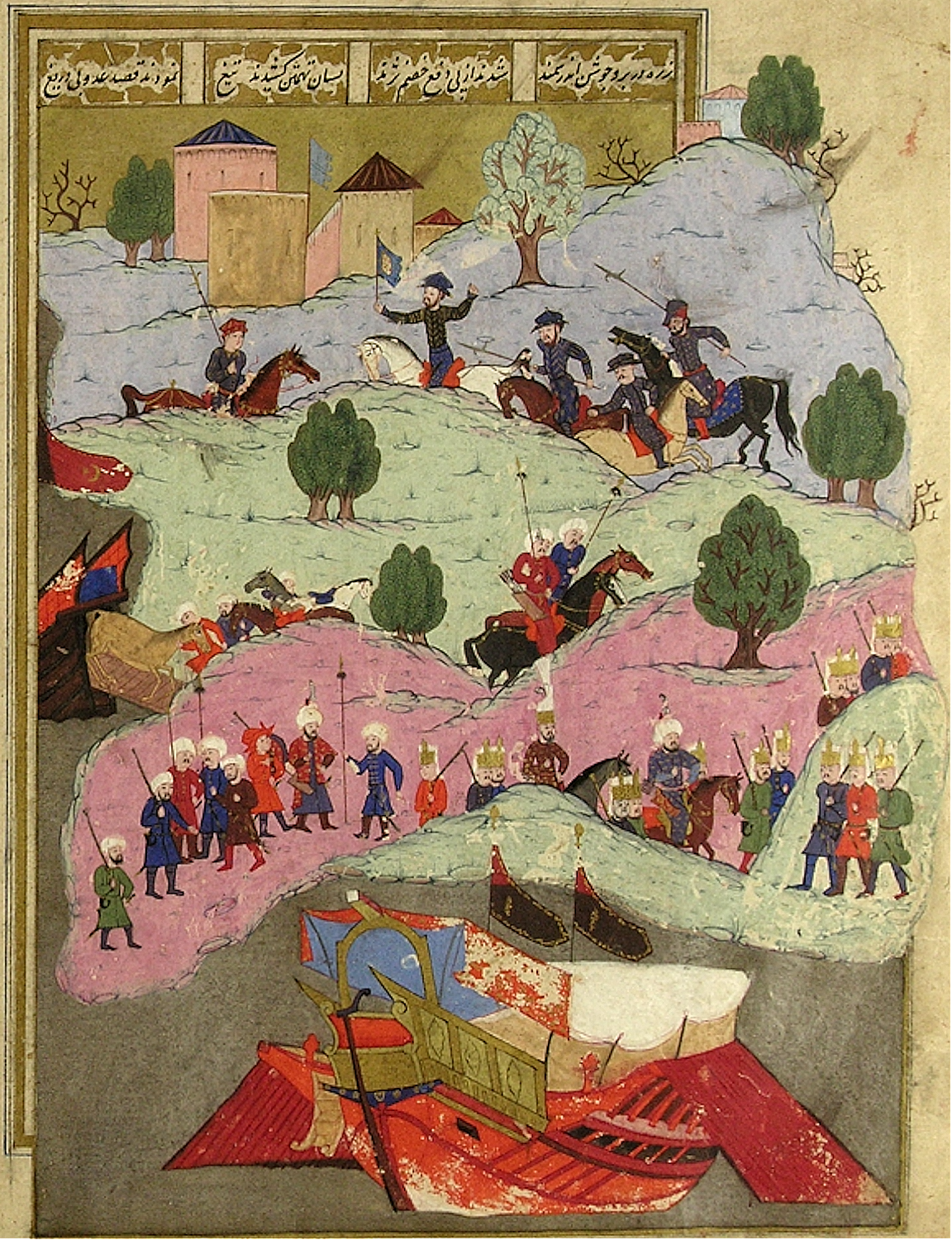
Ottomans conquering the Limassol Castle in 1570

The Ottoman Empire began an invasion of Cyprus in 1570 that led to its occupation. Limassol was conquered in July 1570 without any resistance. After the Ottoman acquisition of Cyprus in 1576, the remains or parts of the remains of the Limassol castle were incorporated in the new Ottoman fort, completed in 1590, which was considerably strengthened. The underground chamber and the first floor were transformed into prison cells and remained in use until 1950.

Some neighbourhoods, primarily to the east of the city, were predominantly Greek, while those to the west were mainly Turkish, with a mixed area around the castle. Christians lived in small, low houses that required one to bend to enter, a deliberate design to prevent Turks from riding horses into their homes. During the period of Turkish rule, Cyprus experienced a general decline. The Turks did not contribute to any development, and Greeks and Turks lived in separate neighbourhoods. The intellectual standards of Cypriots declined due to the lack of interest from the conquerors, oppression, and high taxation, which hindered the intellectual development of children.

The church played an important role in the education of Greeks from 1754 to 1821. Many new schools were established across the island, including the Greek School (modern-day Laniteio Lyceum) in Limassol. Greek history, Turkish and French were taught at schools.

=== British colony ===
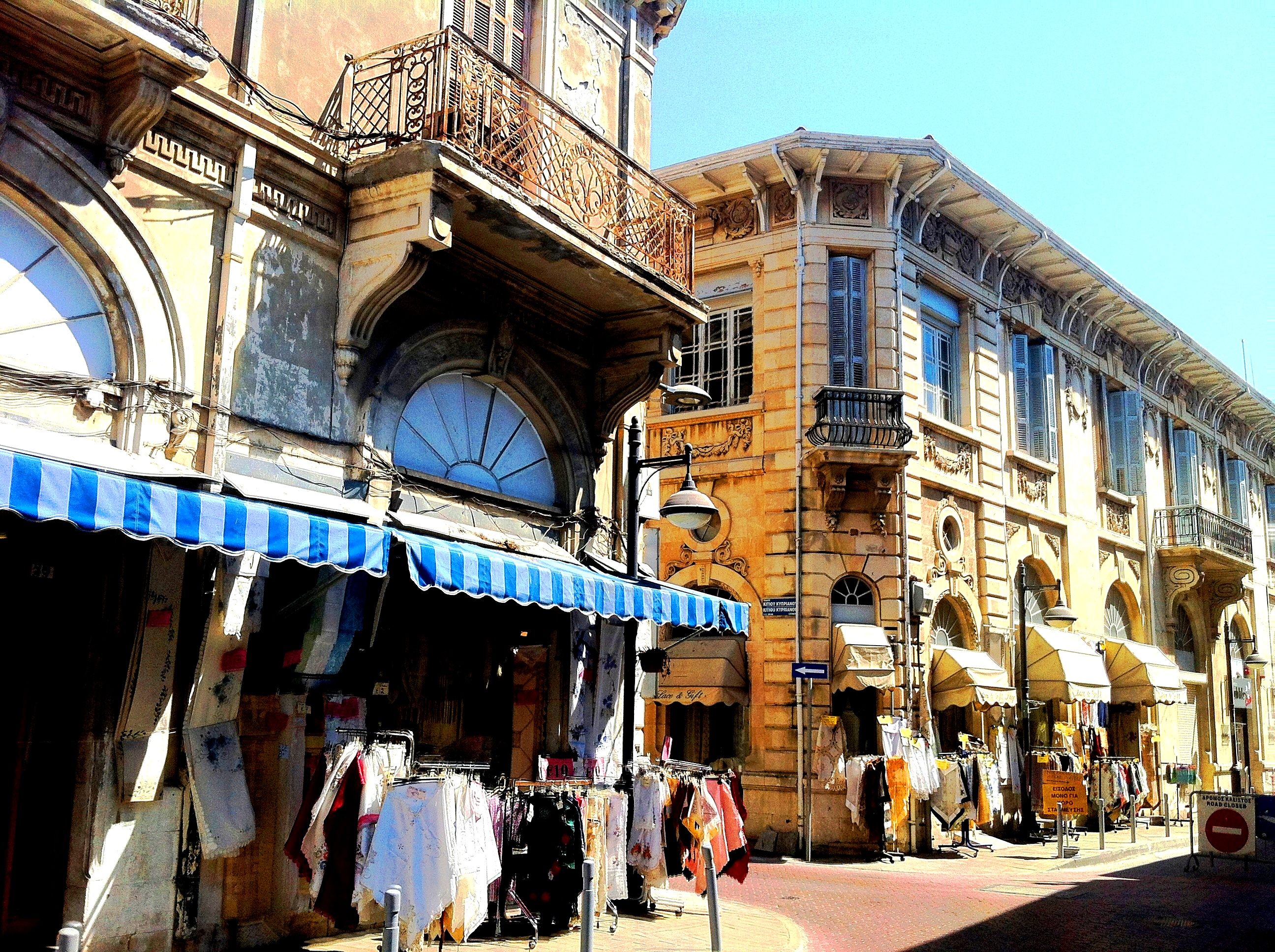
Limassol Old Town with British colonial architecture

In 1878, the British took over administrative control of Cyprus after the Cyprus convention. The first British governor of Limassol was Colonel Warren. He showed a particular interest in Limassol and from the first days the condition of the town showed an improvement. The roads were cleaned, the animals were removed from the centre, roads were fixed, trees were planted and docks were constructed for the loading and unloading of ships anchored off-shore. Lanterns for the lighting of central areas were installed in the 1880s. In 1912, electricity replaced the old lanterns.

A post office, a telegraph office and a hospital began to operate in the early years of British rule. In 1880, the first printing press started working. It was in this printing press that the newspapers Alithia and Anagennisis were published in 1897. The newspaper Salpinx was published at the same time.

At the end of the 19th century, the first hotels began to operate. Among these were Europe and Amathus. These changes that the British brought about contributed to the development of an intellectual and artistic life. Schools, theatres, clubs, art galleries, music halls, sport societies, football clubs etc. were all set up and meant a great deal to the cultural life of Limassol.

=== Modern day ===
Due to the Turkish invasion of Cyprus in 1974 the Turkish Cypriot inhabitants of Limassol were transferred to the north of Cyprus. Accordingly, many Greek Cypriots refugees settled in the city. When Famagusta was occupied by Turkish troops, Limassol experienced rapid growth fuelled by the large population increase and the need for housing. Many luxury hotels, restaurants and entertainment venues were built, making Limassol the new commerce centre of Cyprus, a role which had been filled by Famagusta.

Limassol has become the second largest city in Cyprus and hosts the island's main port.

== Geography ==
=== Municipalities and quarters ===
The Limassol urban area includes the Limassol Municipality and the municipalities of Kato Polemidia, Mesa Geitonia, Agios Athanasios, Germasogeia, and Ypsonas. For administrative purposes, the municipalities of Limassol are divided into quarters, with the exception of Ypsonas.

Map of Limassol's Municipalities and their quarters
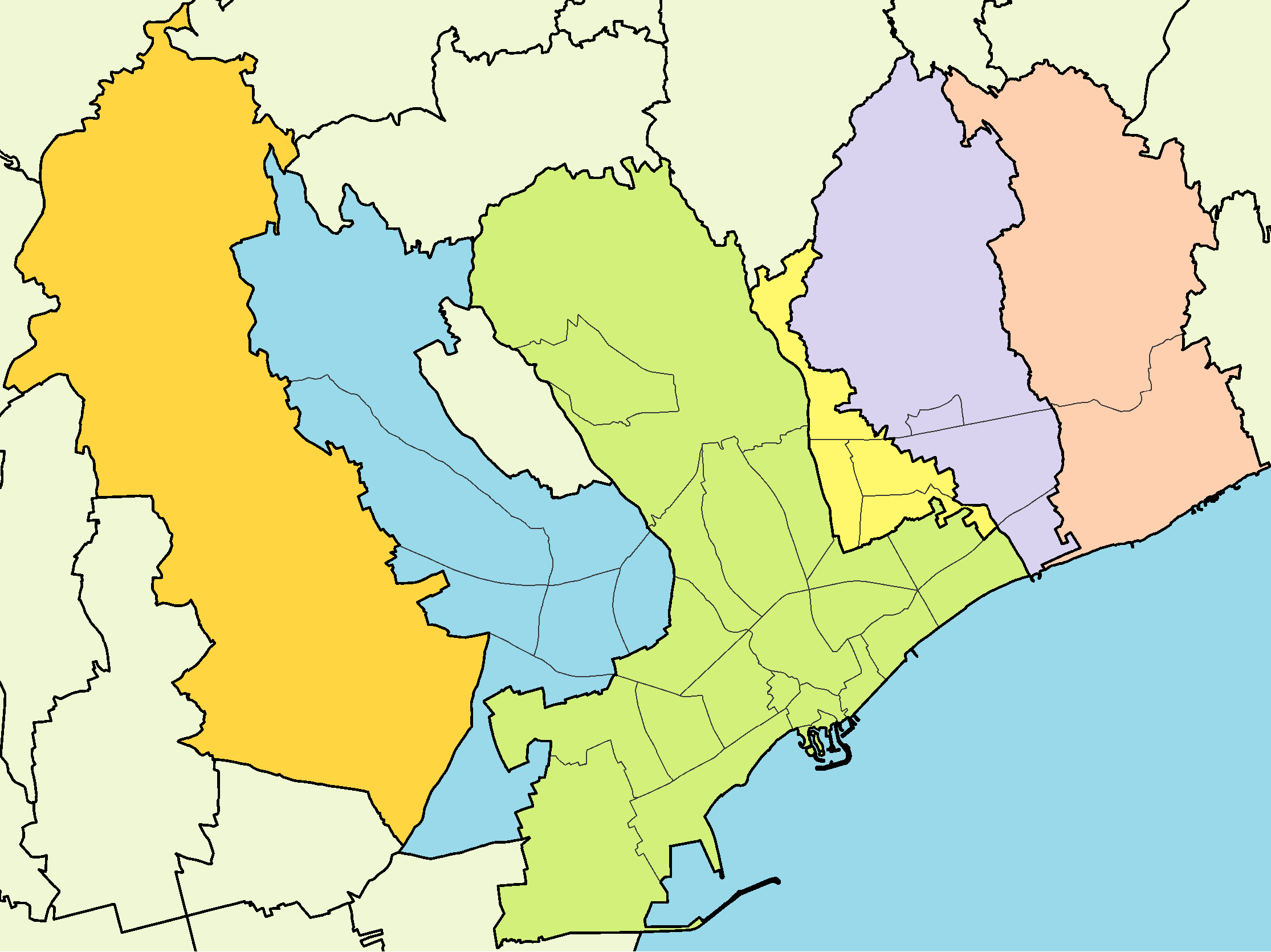

=== Climate ===
Limassol has a hot-summer Mediterranean climate (Köppen climate classification: Csa), closely bordering a hot semi-arid climate (Köppen climate classification: BSh), with hot and dry summers and mild and wet winters, which are separated by short springs and autumns which are generally warm and sunny. From December to March, the weather is unsettled and can be rainy and windy. Sunshine averages around 6 hours a day. During this season there are a few days when the daytime highs might not exceed 12 °C (54 °F) and the night time lows might be as low as 2 °C (36 °F) but usually the temperature ranges from 16 °C (61 °F) to 20 °C (68 °F) in the day and from 7 °C (45 °F) to 12 °C (54 °F) in the night. Rain tends to be heavy this time of the year and thunderstorms occur often though they usually do not last for a long time.

Snow in Limassol is very rare and usually falls mixed with rain every 7 to 13 years. Snow mixed with rain fell in February 2004, in January 2008 and in February 2012. In January 2022 Limassol registered a record low temperature of −0.8 °C (31 °F). In spring the weather is mild to warm and pleasant. It is sunny almost every day and the temperatures are around 19–20 °C (66–68 °F) in the day and 9 °C (48 °F) in the night. Rain showers and thunderstorms are common especially in late March and April. Sometimes during the spring dust comes from the Sahara desert which degrades air quality in the city. Summer for Limassol is the longest season of the year, and lasts about six months; it begins in May and ends in October. At this time of the year, the weather is sunny every day and rain is rare. The temperatures range between 19 °C (66 °F) to 30 °C (86 °F) in June and September and 22 °C (72 °F) to 40 °C (104 °F) in July and August. In June, sea mist can sometimes occur, usually resolving early in the morning. Autumn is warm and usually sunny. It begins in the end of November and in December. During this period of the year, temperatures range from as low as 12 °C (54 °F) to as high as 20 °C (68 °F).

This season the weather differs from year to year and it can be very wet with violent thunderstorms sometimes (October 2009 rainfall was around 90 mm (3.5 in)) or very dry (October 2007 rainfall of 2 to 5 millimetres (0.079 to 0.197 in)). Limassol receives around 410 mm (16.1 in) of rain each year but this varies from year to year and sometimes droughts do occur (every 3–5 years). The rainy season 2009–2010 was a wet one with precipitation being as high as 515 mm (20.3 in) in some areas whilst the rainy season of 2007–2008 was dry with only 300 mm (11.8 in) of rain. Hail is rare and usually falls between October and April.

Climate data for Limassol (1991–2020)
Month	Jan	Feb	Mar	Apr	May	Jun	Jul	Aug	Sep	Oct	Nov	Dec	Year
Record high °C (°F)	23.3 (73.9)	24.4 (75.9)	29.0 (84.2)	33.6 (92.5)	38.6 (101.5)	40.3 (104.5)	38.8 (101.8)	40.2 (104.4)	39.3 (102.7)	35.6 (96.1)	32.5 (90.5)	24.6 (76.3)	40.3 (104.5)
Mean daily maximum °C (°F)	17.9 (64.2)	18.1 (64.6)	20.3 (68.5)	23.4 (74.1)	27.2 (81.0)	31.1 (88.0)	33.5 (92.3)	33.7 (92.7)	31.4 (88.5)	28.2 (82.8)	23.6 (74.5)	19.3 (66.7)	25.6 (78.2)
Daily mean °C (°F)	14.6 (58.3)	14.6 (58.3)	16.4 (61.5)	18.9 (66.0)	22.7 (72.9)	26.3 (79.3)	28.9 (84.0)	29.1 (84.4)	26.9 (80.4)	23.8 (74.8)	19.6 (67.3)	15.9 (60.6)	21.5 (70.6)
Mean daily minimum °C (°F)	11.2 (52.2)	11.1 (52.0)	12.4 (54.3)	14.3 (57.7)	17.1 (62.8)	21.4 (70.5)	24.2 (75.6)	24.5 (76.1)	22.3 (72.1)	19.4 (66.9)	15.5 (59.9)	12.4 (54.3)	17.2 (62.9)
Record low °C (°F)	−0.8 (30.6)	1.0 (33.8)	3.4 (38.1)	5.0 (41.0)	11.1 (52.0)	13.9 (57.0)	19.0 (66.2)	18.9 (66.0)	13.8 (56.8)	8.8 (47.8)	3.8 (38.8)	0.5 (32.9)	−0.8 (30.6)
Average rainfall mm (inches)	86.7 (3.41)	66.9 (2.63)	35.8 (1.41)	18.4 (0.72)	5.1 (0.20)	1.4 (0.06)	0.0 (0.0)	0.0 (0.0)	2.9 (0.11)	13.1 (0.52)	77.5 (3.05)	99.7 (3.93)	407.5 (16.04)
Average rainy days (≥ 1 mm)	10.2	8.7	6.4	3.5	1.8	0.5	0.1	0.1	0.6	3.2	5.8	10.9	51.8
Mean monthly sunshine hours	195.3	211.7	244.9	270.0	344.1	381.0	390.6	365.8	315.0	285.2	225.0	186.0	3,414.6
Average ultraviolet index	3	4	6	8	10	11	11	10	8	6	4	3	7
Source: Meteorological Service (Cyprus)

Average sea temperature
Jan	Feb	Mar	Apr	May	Jun	Jul	Aug	Sep	Oct	Nov	Dec	Year
17.8 °C (64.0 °F)	17.0 °C (62.6 °F)	17.3 °C (63.1 °F)	18.1 °C (64.6 °F)	20.8 °C (69.4 °F)	24.4 °C (75.9 °F)	27.2 °C (81.0 °F)	28.0 °C (82.4 °F)	27.2 °C (81.0 °F)	25.2 °C (77.4 °F)	22.1 °C (71.8 °F)	19.6 °C (67.3 °F)	22.0 °C (71.6 °F)

== Transport ==
Limassol is one of the island's main on-island transportation hubs. The city is home to the largest port on the island, which handles almost exclusively all passenger boat traffic inbound and outbound the island, but 98% of off-island travel is handled by airports.

=== Bus ===
EMEL (Limassol Passenger Transport Company) (Greek: Εταιρεία Μεταφοράς Επιβάτων Λεμεσού, ΕΜΕΛ), is the main operator of buses in Limassol. As of 2024, its network consists of around 53 bus lines, spanning the Limassol district, making up a fleet of approximately 150 buses, 35 of which are electric. National and regional bus links are provided by InterCity Buses from the Limassol Port passenger building.

=== Ferry ===
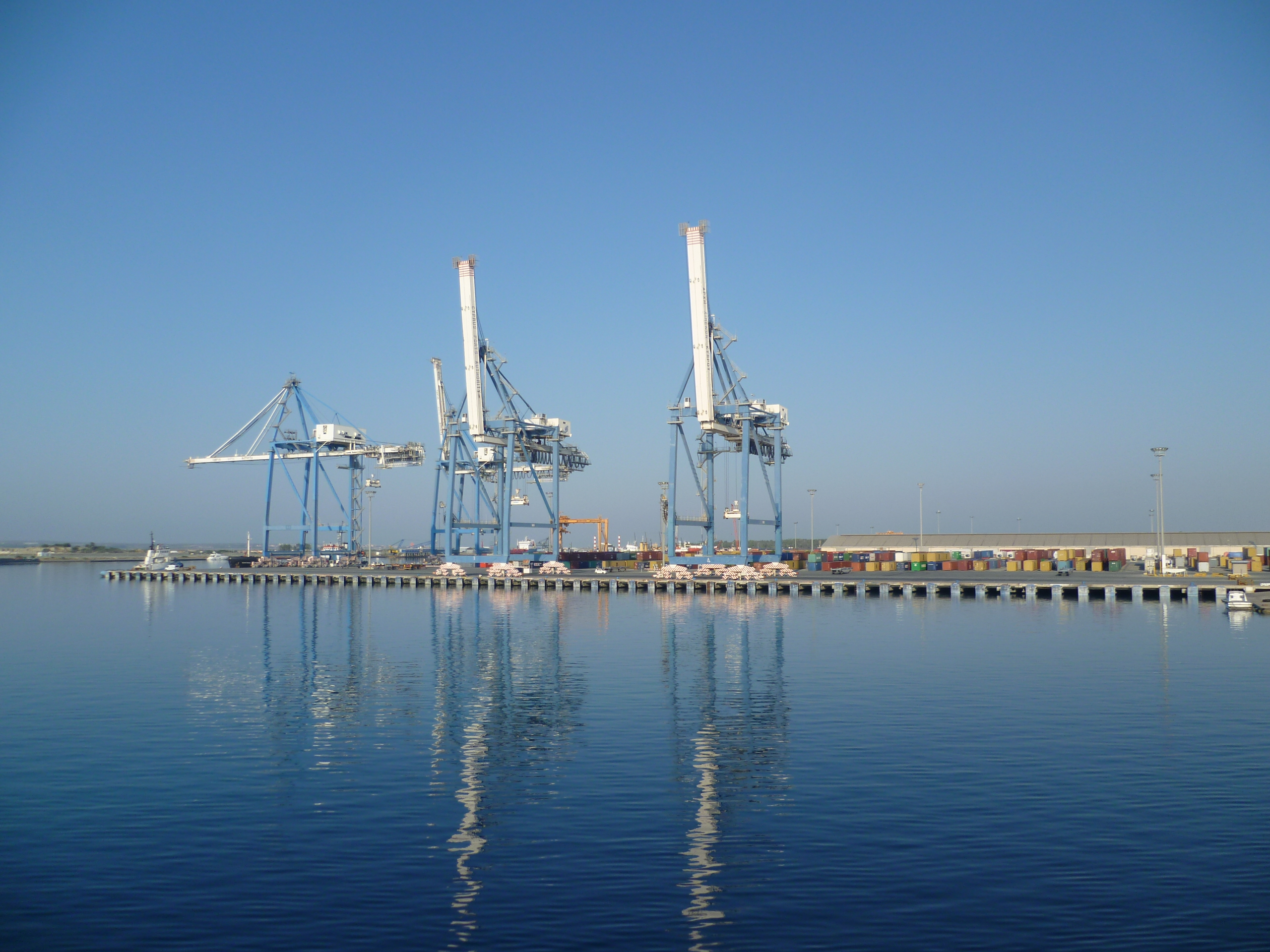
Cranes at the Port of Limassol, 2011

The Port of Limassol is the largest port in Cyprus. Commercial and passenger cruises make frequent stops at the port.

=== Motorways ===
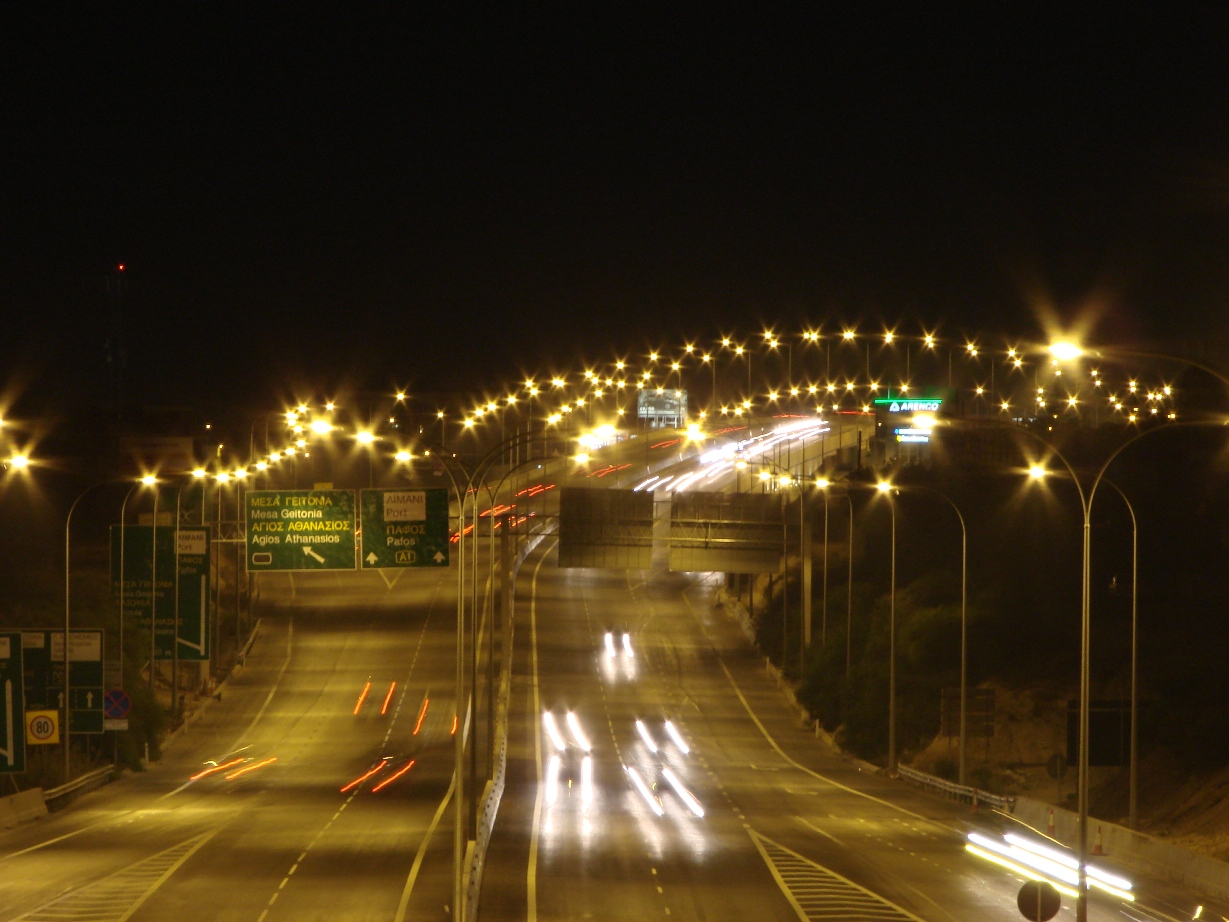
A1 motorway in Limassol

The city is a highway hub, crossing the following motorways:

- A1 motorway to the north, to Nicosia
- A5 motorway to the east, to Larnaca and Famagusta
- A6 motorway to the west, to Paphos
- A8 motorway to the north, to Saittas village (under construction as of 2024)

=== Airports ===
While Limassol is not home to any airports, the city is close to two international airports; Larnaca International Airport (situated approx. 60 km (37 mi) north-east from the city) and Paphos International Airport (approx. 50 km (31 mi) north-west). Bus links connect both airports with the city, served by Limassol Airport Express from Chavouzas station.

== Demographics ==
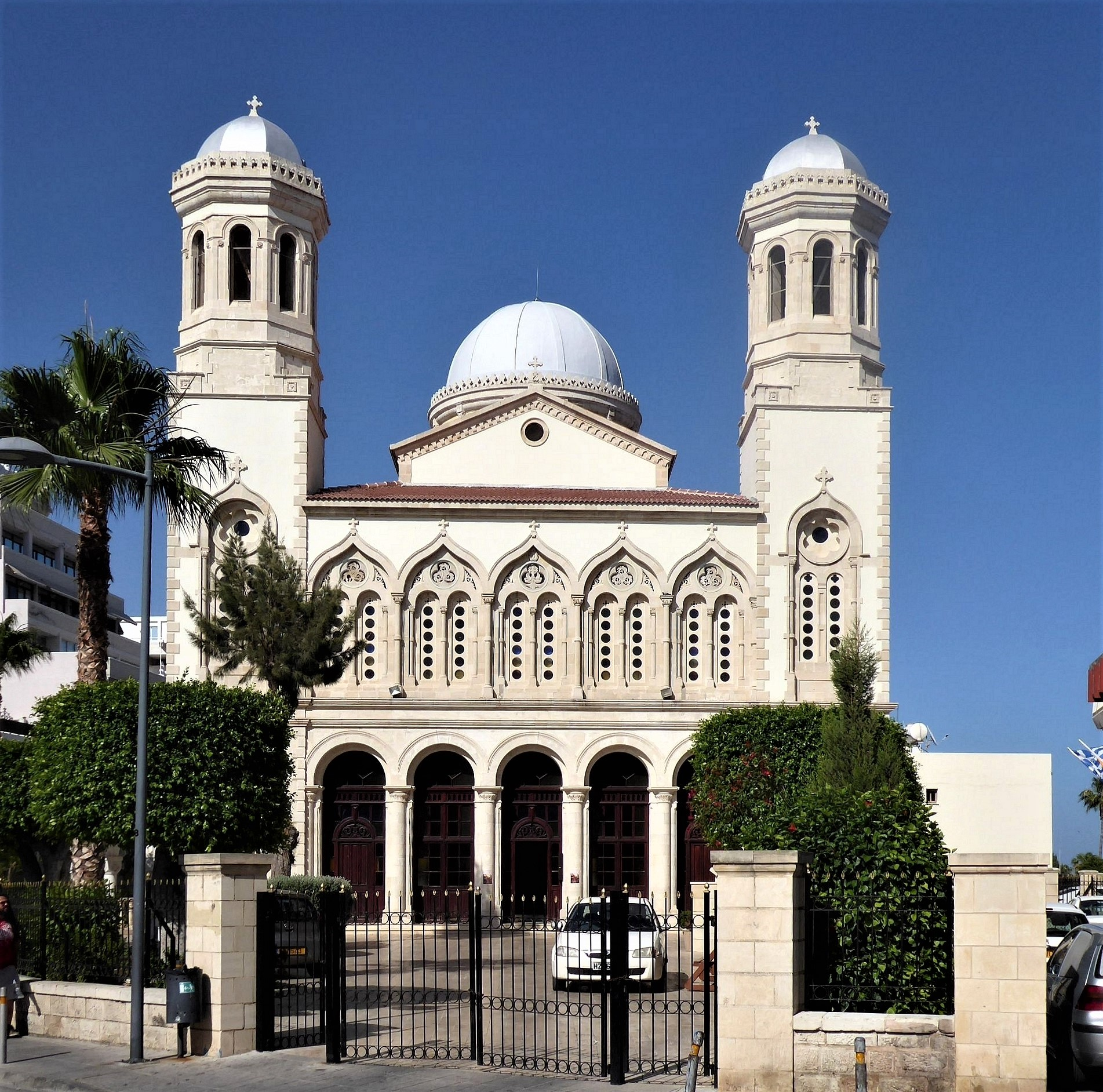
Agia Napa Church

Limassol is the 2nd most populous district in Cyprus, with 262,238 residents as of the 2021 Cyprus census, while the city itself has 198,558 residents. The district population's citizenships in 2021 was 77.7% Cypriot, 8.6% EU citizen, 13.1% Foreign citizen, with 0.6% not stating their nationality. Between 2011 and 2021, the district gained 26,827 residents.

Since the 1960s, internal migration and the influx of displaced persons after the 1974 invasion have significantly increased the population of Limassol and its suburbs.

Limassol is home to a large community of Pontic Greeks, who settled in Cyprus after the collapse of the Soviet Union.

The city has also become increasingly popular with Russian and other post-Soviet nationals and expatriates, earning the nickname "Limassolgrad". As of 2013, about 17% of Limassol's population is Russian-speaking, and 8% are Russian citizens.

=== Historical ===
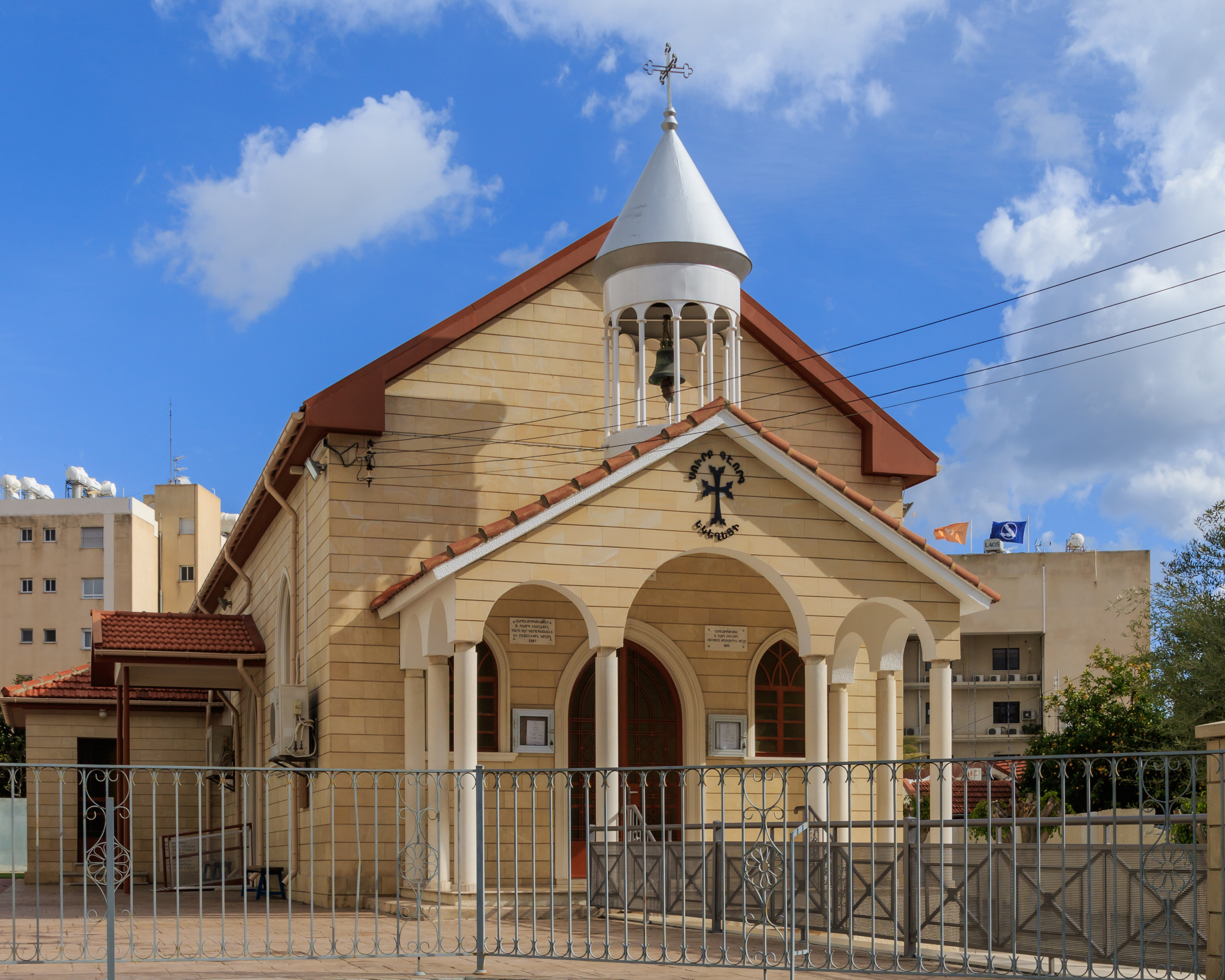
Sourp Kevork Armenian Apostolic Church

Historically, Limassol had a mixed population of Greek Cypriots, Turkish Cypriots, and Armenian Cypriots. Most Turkish Cypriots moved to the north in 1974 and 1975. Consequently, many Greek Cypriots from the north, who became refugees following the Turkish invasion, settled in the city. In the 1990s, several Cypriot Romani people (considered Turkish Cypriots according to the constitution) returned from the north to the Turkish quarter of Limassol. Armenians remained in Limassol, residing around the Sourp Kevork Armenian Apostolic Church and maintain the Nareg Armenian School (Armenian: Նարեկ Հայկական Վարժարան).

The birth rate rose by 70% during the late 19th and 20th centuries (1878–1960). The number of inhabitants increased from 6,131 in 1881 to 43,593 in 1960. The Greek Cypriot population was estimated at 37,478, while the Turkish Cypriot population was at 6,115.

== Education ==
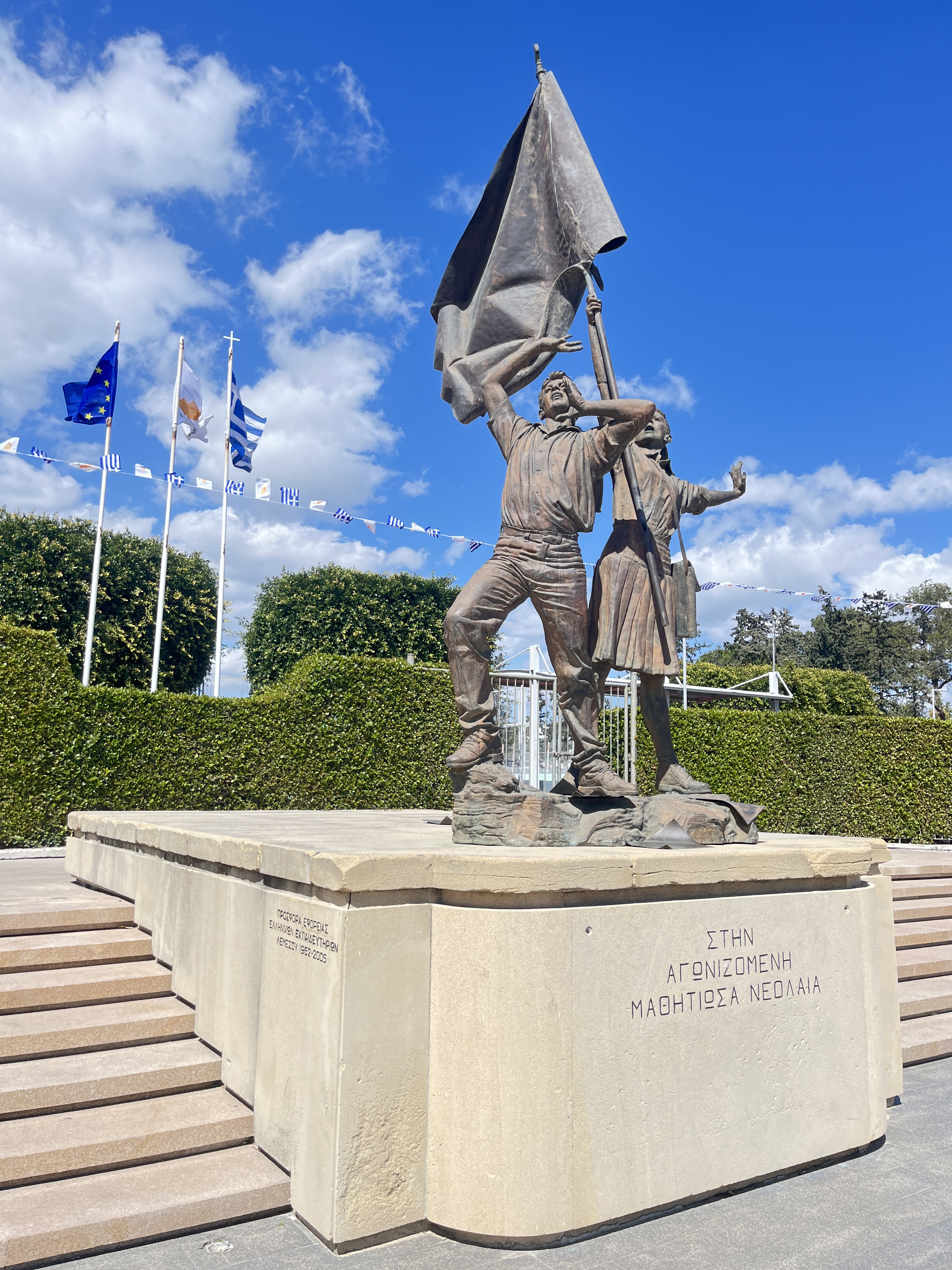
Monument of Fighting Youth, a work dedicated to the student warriors of Cypriot Hellenism

Limassol has a comprehensive educational infrastructure, encompassing primary, secondary, and tertiary education. There are over a hundred public educational institutions in the city, with instruction primarily in Greek. Laniteio Lyceum, the oldest lyceum in the city and the largest on the island, was originally founded in 1819 as the "Greek School" and played a leading role in advancing education during periods of limited public provision.

In recent years, Limassol has emerged as a significant education hub, particularly for private and international secondary education. The city hosts sixteen private secondary schools, offering instruction in English, French, Greek, Russian, Ukrainian, and other languages. Notable institutions include The Grammar School, Foley's School, The Heritage Private School, American Academy, Pascal International Education, The Island Private School, IMS Private School, Silverline, and Trinity Private School. These schools offer a variety of curricula, including the British curriculum (IGCSE/A-Levels), International Baccalaureate (IB), Waldorf education, Montessori, and other international programs.

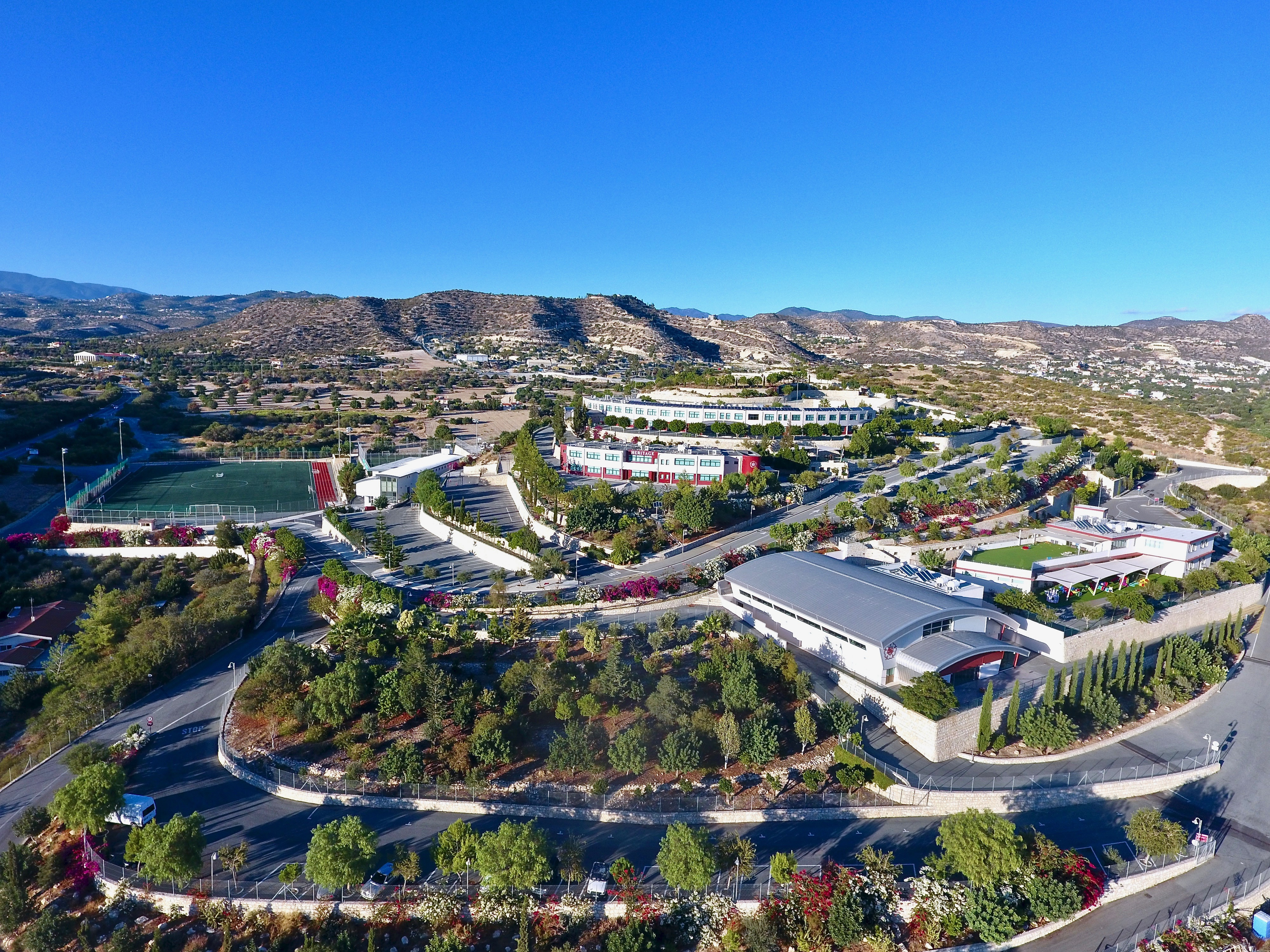
The Heritage Private School

Several new campuses have been announced or are under development. Pascal International Education is expanding with two new campuses in Limassol, one of which will offer the IB Diploma Programme starting in 2025. The Island Private School, an IB Continuum school, is expanding to include a boarding facility. In 2025, construction is expected to begin on a €50 million Jewish educational campus in the area of Polemidia, funded by the Yael Foundation and set to open in 2027 as a flagship international school for up to 1,500 students.

In addition to the various Greek and English speaking schools, the Nareg Armenian School also has a campus in the city, one of three on the island. Another notable example is Saint Mary's School, a Catholic institution founded in 1923 by the Franciscan Missionary Sisters of the Sacred Heart, offering primary and secondary education to students of all religions. Its curriculum places strong emphasis on modern languages—including English, Greek, French, and Italian—while gradually integrating science and commercial subjects.

In terms of higher education, Limassol is the base of Cyprus University of Technology, one of three state universities. The city is also home to Frederick University and the University of Limassol, which are both private universities. Many institutions of tertiary education can be found in the city.

== Economy ==
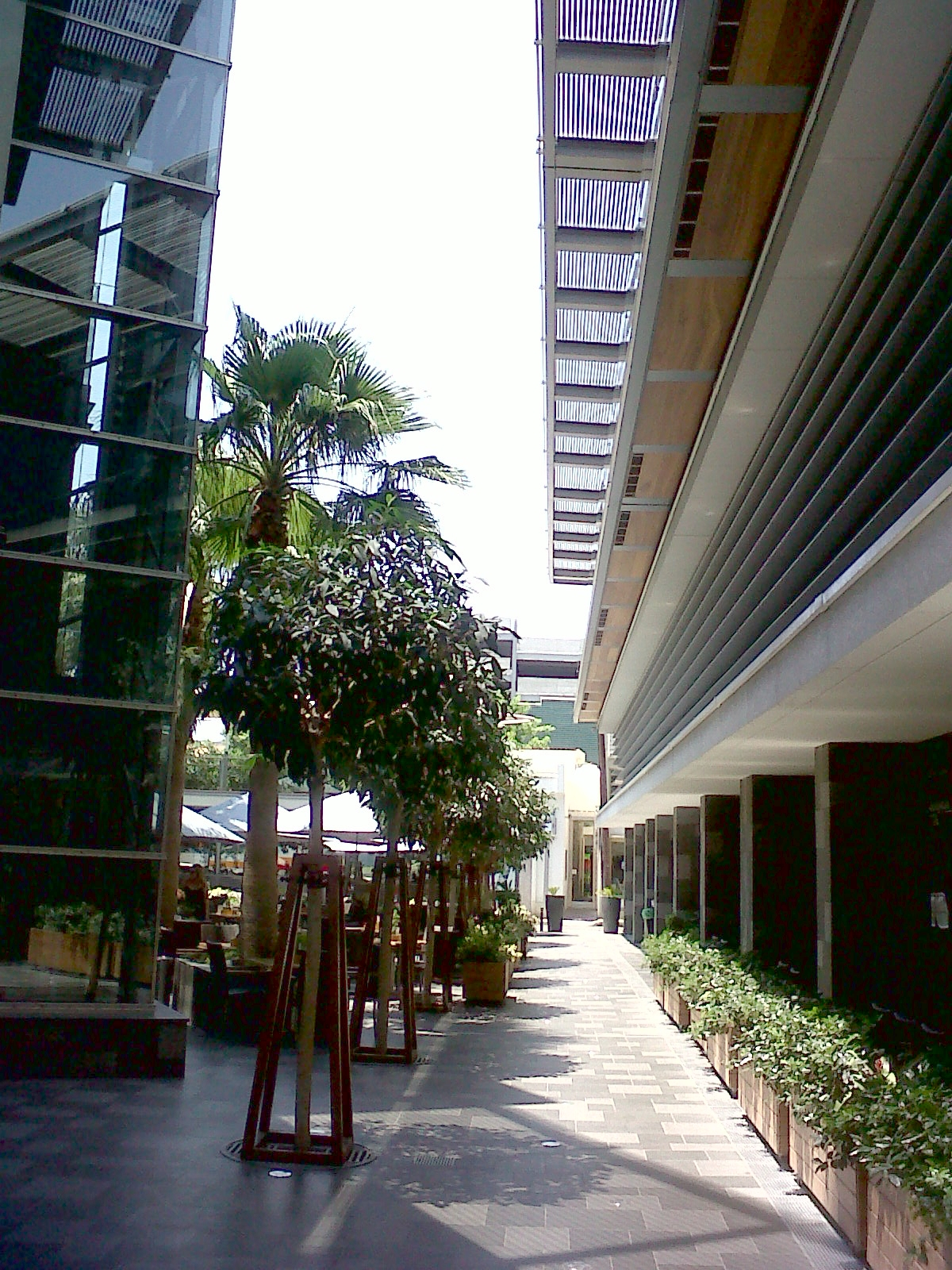
Columbia Plaza in the Old City centre

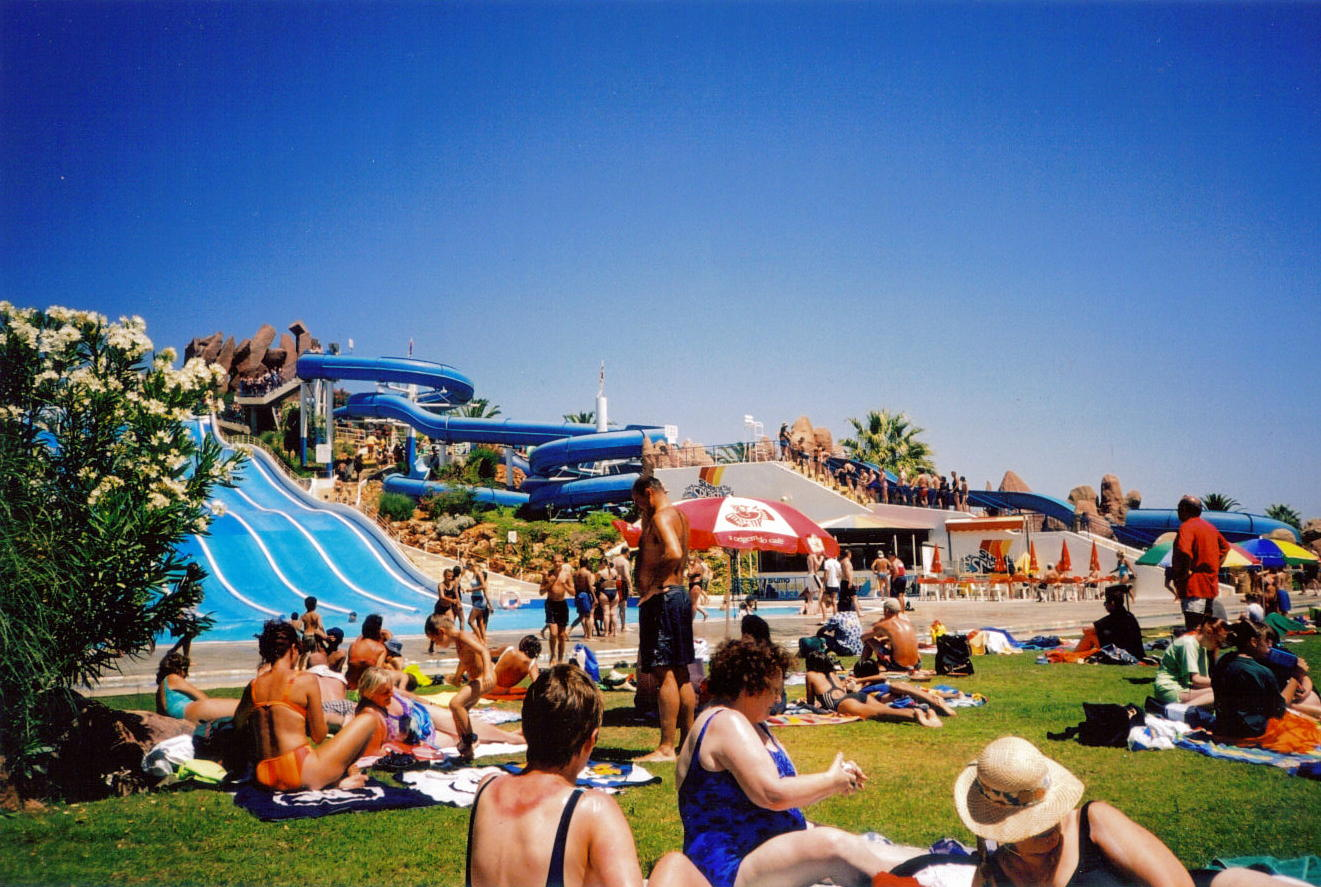
Fasouri Watermania, Cyprus' biggest waterpark

Tourism in Limassol began to flourish after 1974, following the occupation of Famagusta and Kyrenia –the principal tourist resorts of Cyprus– during the 1974 Turkish invasion of Cyprus. Limassol has many beaches, suitable for sunbathing and swimming. A bathing beach with all the necessary facilities, provided by the Cyprus Tourism Organisation, operates in the Dasoudi area.

In 1974, the Port of Limassol became the Republic of Cyprus's main seaport. Prior to that, the role had been filled by the port of Famagusta, now located in the largely unrecognised Turkish Republic of Northern Cyprus.

Limassol is home to many of Cyprus's wine companies, which cater to the wine-growing regions on the southern slopes of the Troodos Mountains, including Commandaria. Companies such as KEO, LOEL, SODAP, and ETKO produce award-winning wines and brandies (cognacs) in international exhibitions. These products are highly consumed by both locals and tourists, with significant quantities exported to Europe.

Limassol is the largest industrial centre in the district, hosting around 350 industrial units with 90 industry wares. These industries include dressmaking, furniture, footwear, beverages, food, printing, metalwork, electrical devices, plastics, and more.

Limassol is a key trade centre in Cyprus, partially due to the presence of the British base at Akrotiri, and the population displacement following the Turkish invasion in 1974. The main trade markets are located in the town centre and the coastal tourist area, stretching from the Old Port to the Amathus area. This area is home to most of the hotels, restaurants, confectioneries, discos, and entertainment venues. Major global retail shops can be found on Anexartisias Street and Makariou Avenue, the city's primary shopping streets, as well as at My Mall, the largest mall in the district.

Limassol has two ports, commonly known as the Old Port (Limassol Marina) and the New Port (Port of Limassol). The New Port handles the majority of commercial and passenger traffic and is one of the busiest ports in the Mediterranean transit trade and is the largest port in the Republic of Cyprus. With a depth of 11 metres (36 feet) and breakwaters extending 1,300 metres (4,300 feet), it can receive about ten ships, depending on their size. The Old Port, with a 250 metres (820 feet) breakwater, can accommodate only three small ships at a time and is primarily used by fishing boats. These ports facilitate the export of grapes, wines, carobs, and citrus fruits, as well as the import of cereals, vehicles, machinery, textiles, agricultural medicines, fertilisers, and iron.

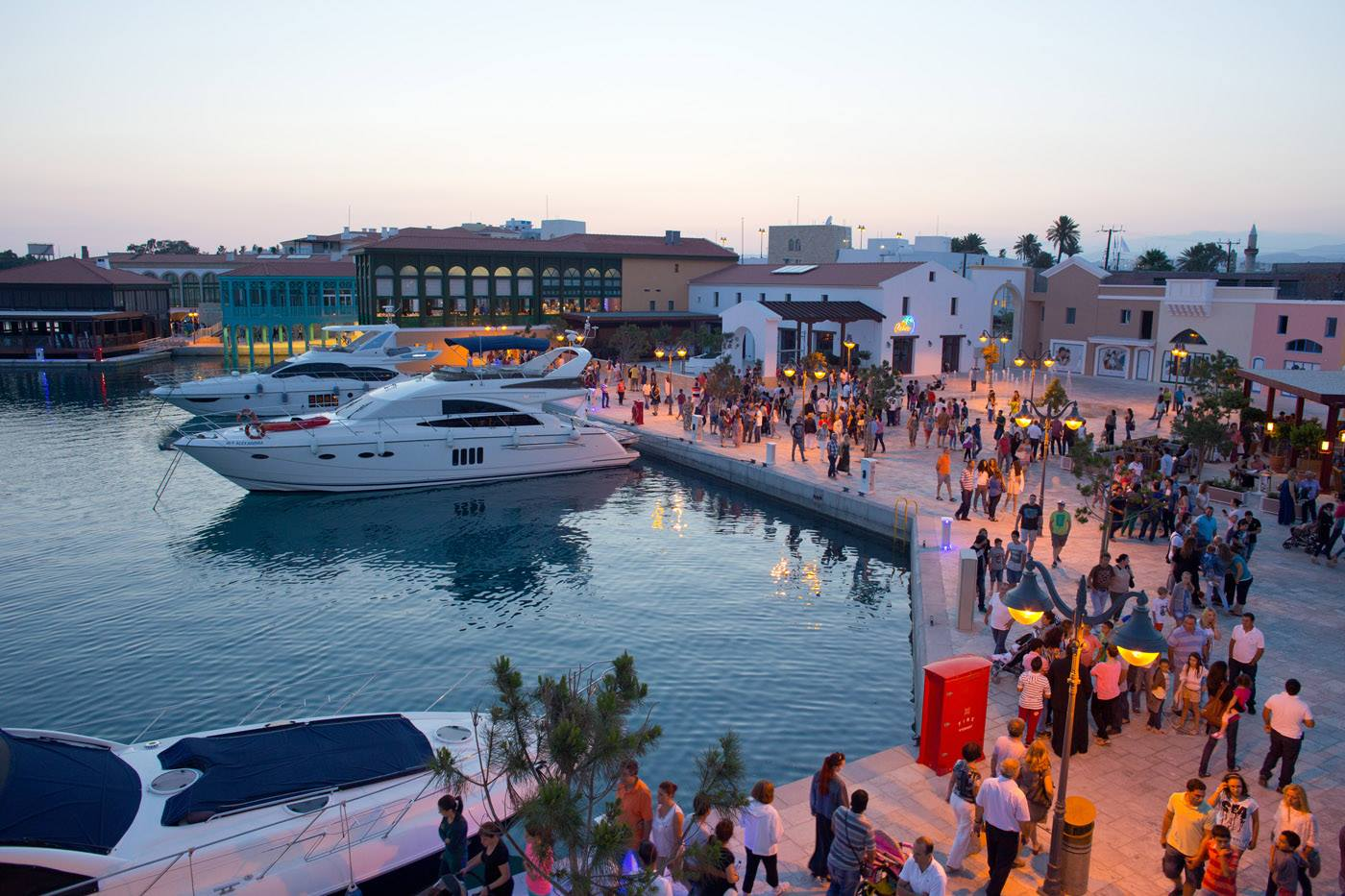
Yachts at the Limassol Marina

The Limassol Marina, built in 2014, is 500 metres (1,600 feet) west of Limassol Castle, on the Old Port. This new development allows berthing of ocean-going yachts, having hosted its first yachts in 2013. The marina has a capacity of 1,000 vessels.

Since 2014, Limassol has experienced a construction boom driven by the tourism sector and increasing foreign investments. Public projects, such as the redesign of the one-kilometre (0.62-mile) Limassol Molos promenade, have enhanced the quality of life and the city's image as a cosmopolitan destination. Infrastructure improvements, partly funded by European programs, have addressed traffic issues with new highway flyovers and roundabouts.

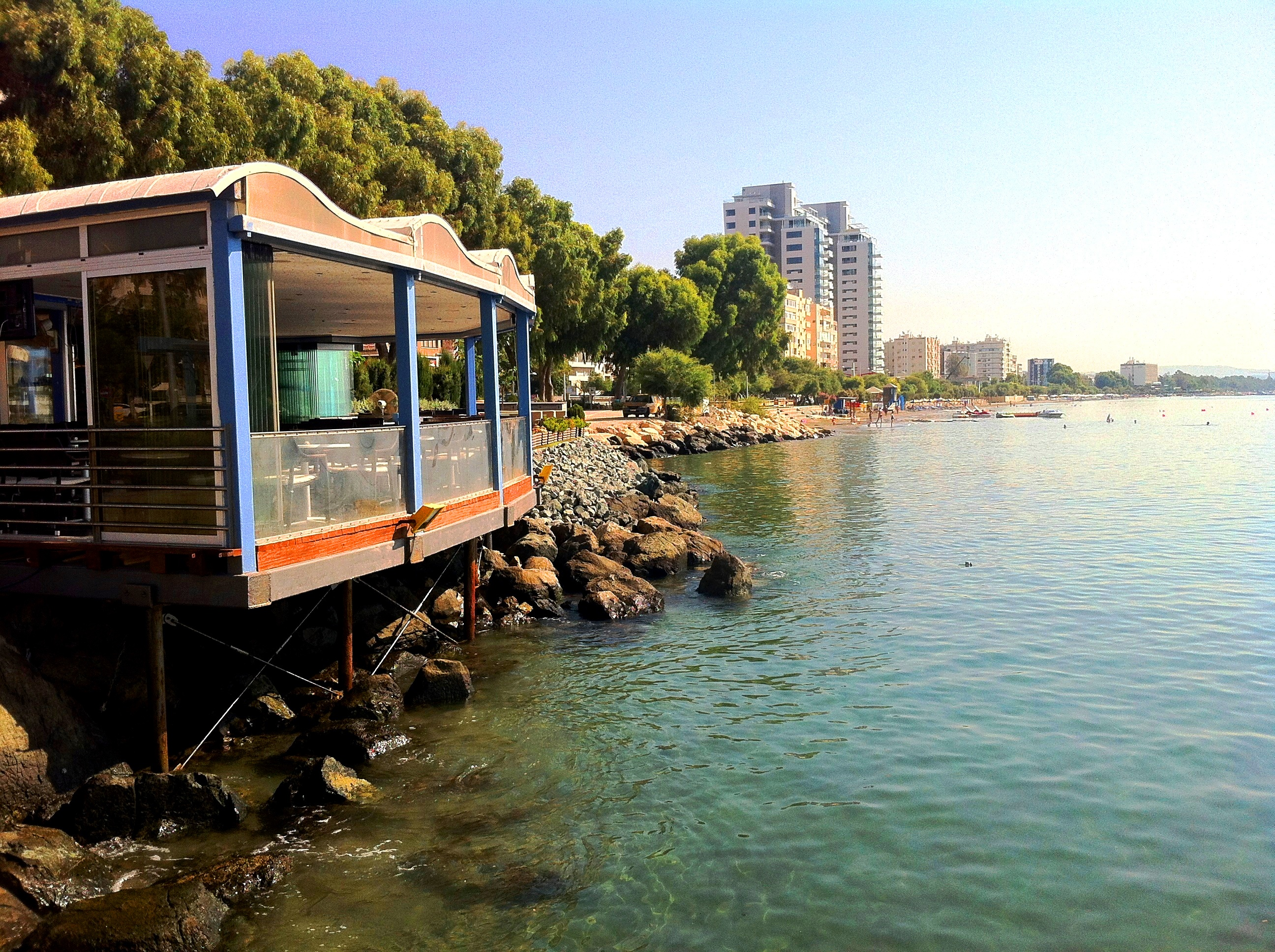
Columbia Pier at Akti Olympion, 2012

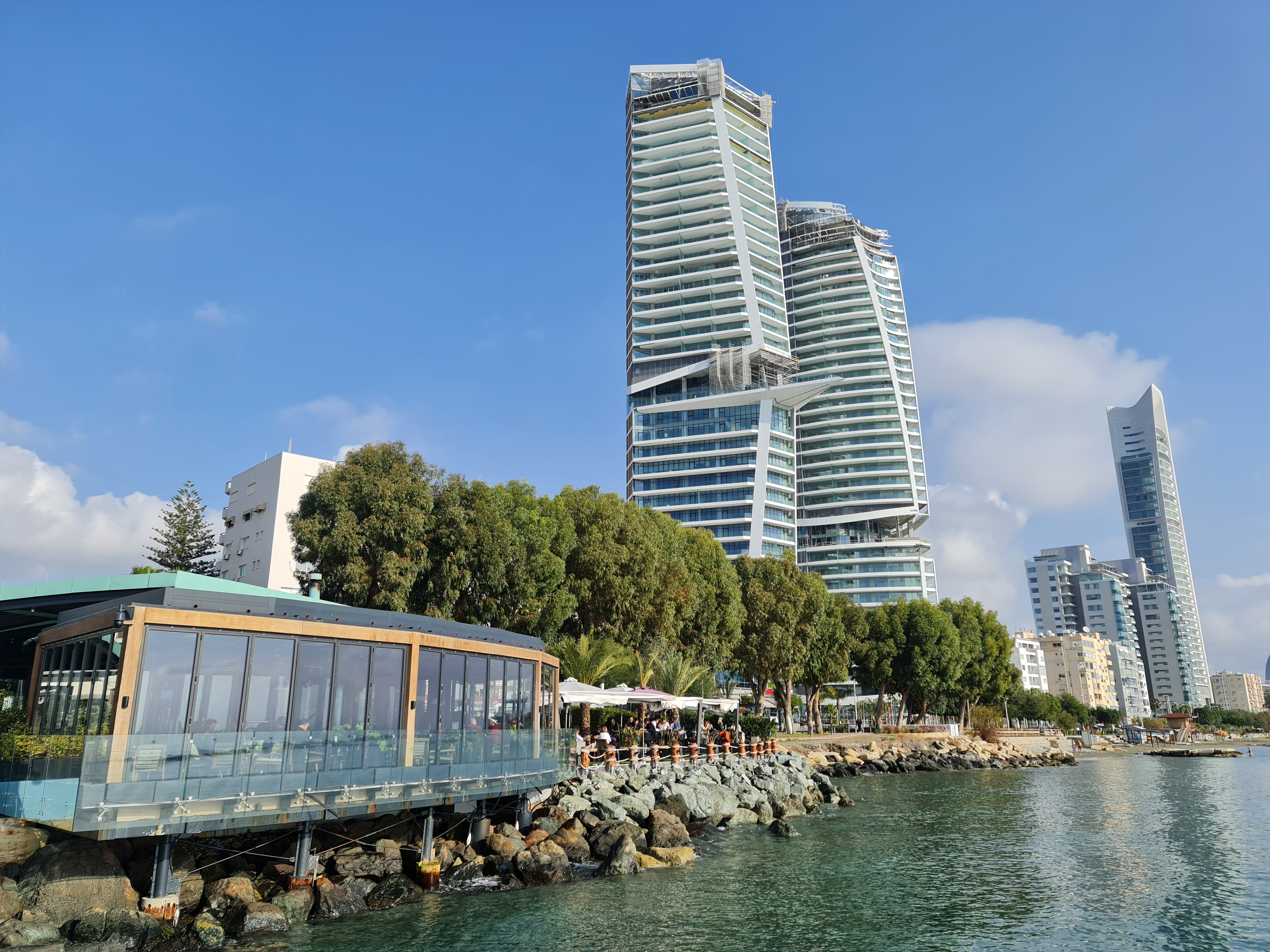
The same location in 2024

Limassol has become a major centre for tourism, trade, and services. The city offers numerous museums and archaeological sites for visitors. It attracts a diverse range of tourists, especially during the extended summer season, accommodated within a wide variety of hotels and apartments available.

The Limassol coastline, known as "The Limassol Riviera", is undergoing a significant construction boom that began in late 2013 with new legislation encouraging development; becoming Europe's newest riviera. Since then, hundreds of new housing units and mushrooming businesses are introduced to the community annually. Currently, over 70 buildings taller than 50 metres (160 ft) are proposed or under construction, including 32 skyscrapers. Among these is One Limassol, Cyprus's tallest tower and Europe's tallest seafront residential building. Another project is the "City of Dreams Mediterranean (CoDM)", the first and largest integrated resort in Europe. In 2023, CoDM received the Seven Stars Luxury Hospitality and Lifestyle Award for "Best New Luxury Casino Resort in the World".

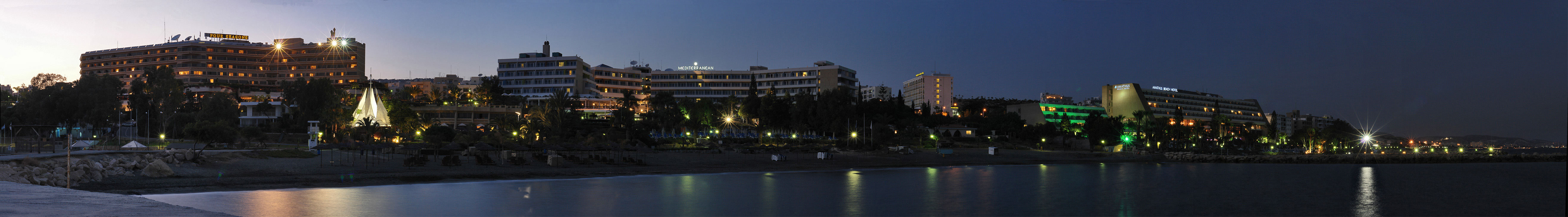
Tourist area of Limassol with Hotels and Resorts

== Landmarks ==
=== Archaeological sites ===
==== Amathus ====
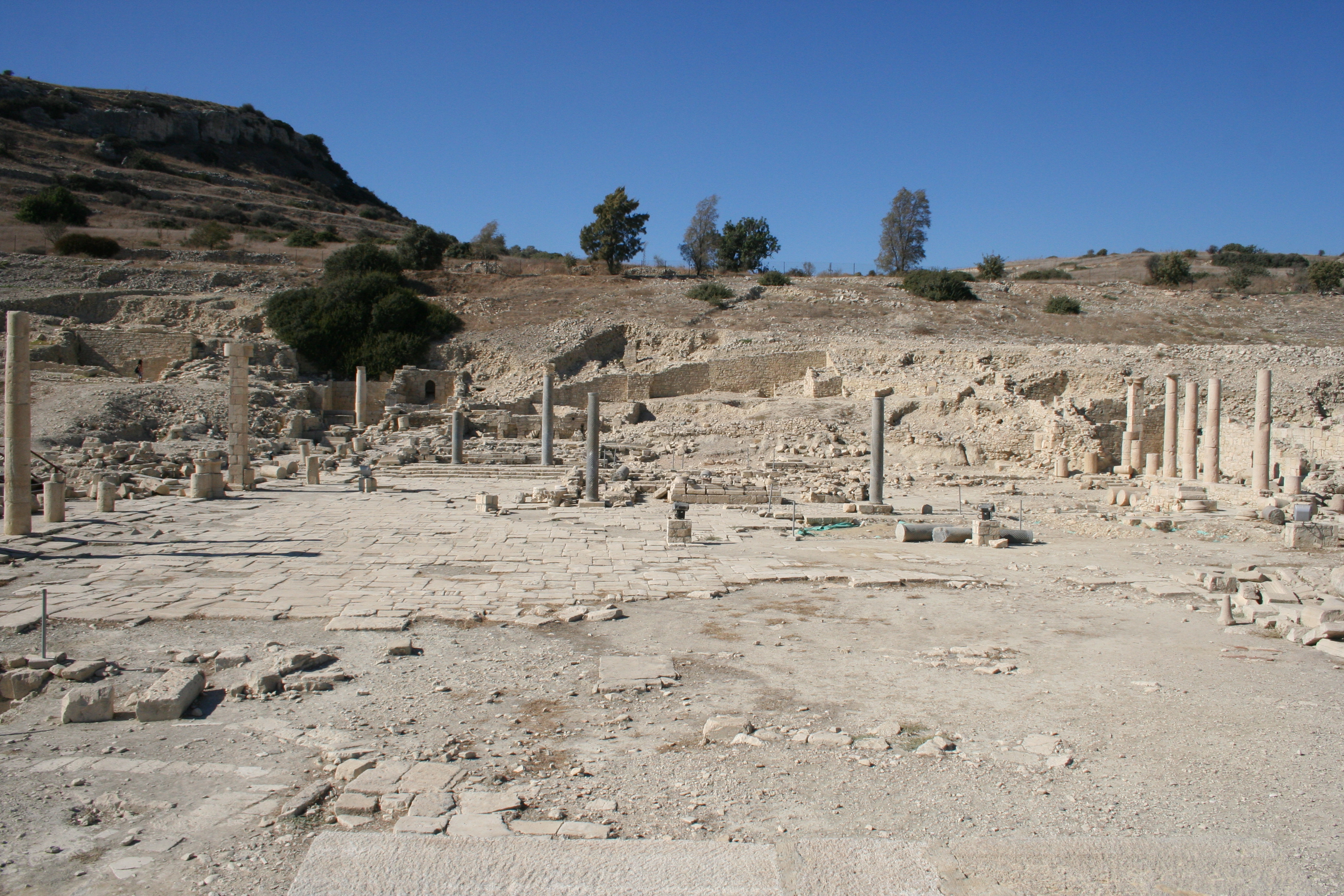
Ancient city of Amathus

Amathus is an ancient city-kingdom, located about 11 kilometres (6.8 mi) east of Limassol, dating back to 1100 BC, with a rich history with various influences by various civilisations. The most notable ruin is considered to be the Temple of Aphrodite, a major centre of worship and a sacred place for ceremonies and offerings, sitting atop the Acropolis of Amathus. Many tombs dating to the Iron Age are present, as well as remnants of public baths and other buildings in the ancient agora. A large limestone amphora, now housed in the Louvre, was found in Amathus. This vase dates back to the 6th century BC and weighs 14 tonnes (14,000 kg).

==== Kourion ====
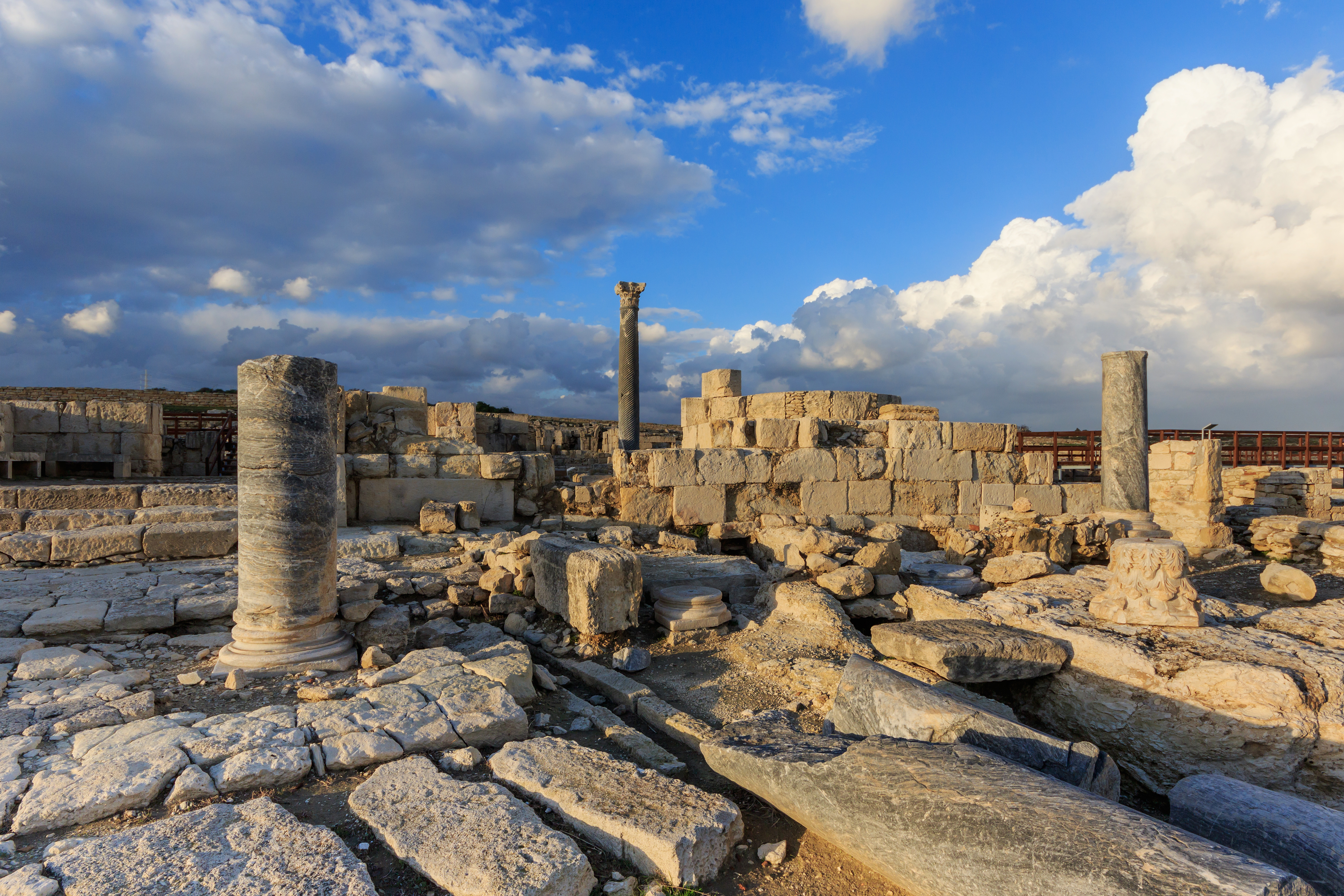
Kourion agora

Kourion is another ancient city-kingdom, situated approx. 19 kilometres (12 mi) west of Limassol, with a rich history dating back to the Neolithic period, with significant developments during the Hellenistic, Roman, and Early Christian periods. The centerpiece of Kourion is the Greco-Roman theatre, originally built in the 2nd century BC and expanded in the 2nd century AD. It has been restored and is still used for open-air performances, overlooking the Mediterranean Sea. The Sanctuary of Apollo Hylates was dedicated to Apollo Hylates, the god of the woodland. It includes the remains of a temple, a bath complex, and a palaestra (wrestling school).

=== Museums ===
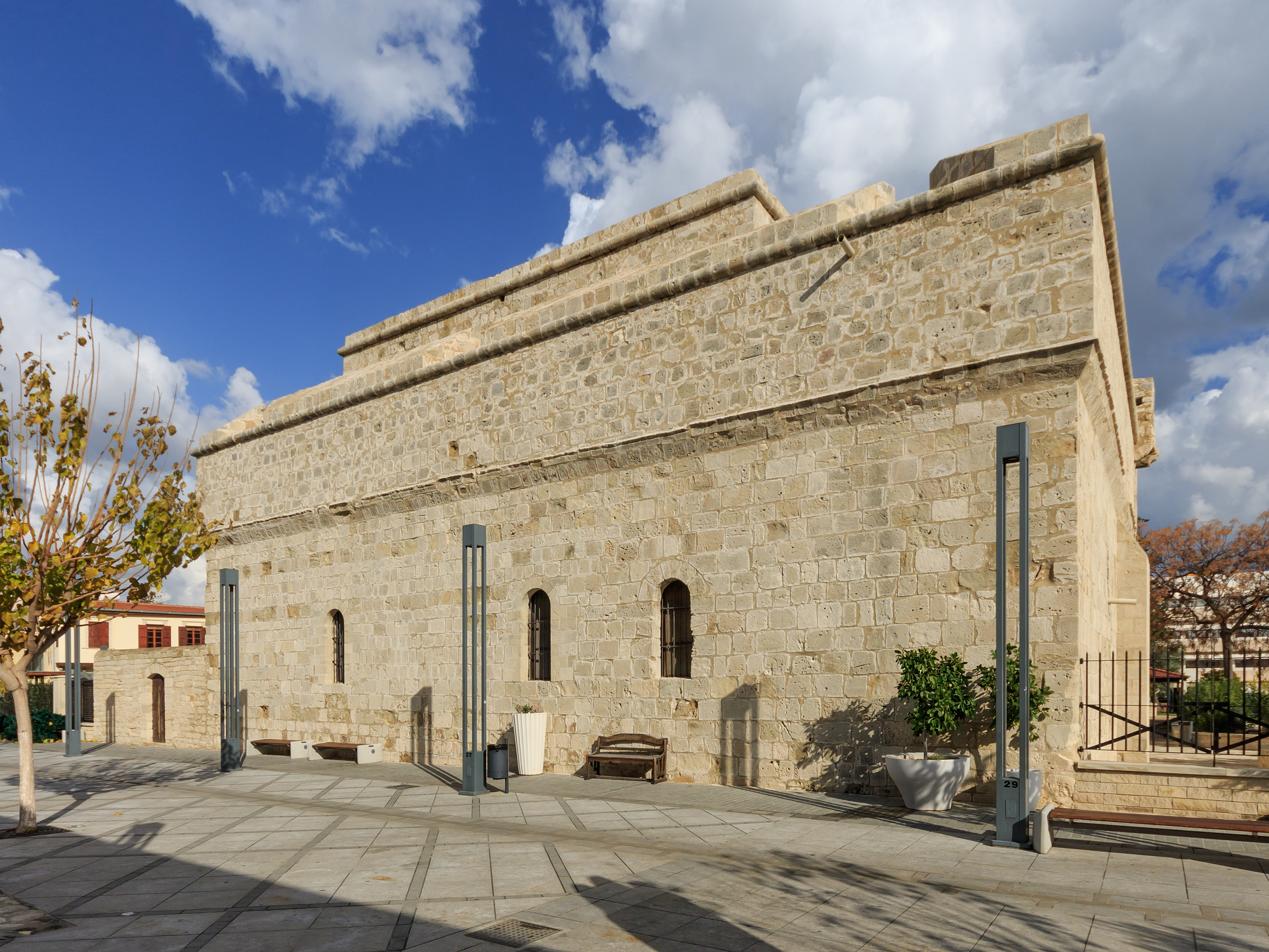
Limassol Castle

The medieval Limassol Castle is one of the ten castles of Cyprus, constructed by the Byzantines around 1000 AD. A chapel was also built on the site during the same period. It is believed that Richard the Lionheart married his fiancée, Princess Berengaria of Navarre, at this location in 1191 after her ship was grounded nearby while she was accompanying him on the Third Crusade. The castle served as a prison from 1790 to 1940 and now functions as a medieval museum. The museum's collection spans from 400 to 1870 AD, showcasing a variety of exhibits including cannons, 17th and 18th-century wood carvings, paintings, tombstones, statues, suits of armor, coins, terracotta, metalware, pottery, glass, and marble artifacts. The Kolossi Castle, around 11 kilometres (6.8 mi) west of Limassol, is a medieval fortress originally built in the 13th century by the Knights Hospitaller. The current structure, rebuilt in 1454, features a well-preserved three-story keep and an attached rectangular enclosure. The castle played a significant role in the production of sugar from local sugarcane and is also associated with the famous Commandaria wine.

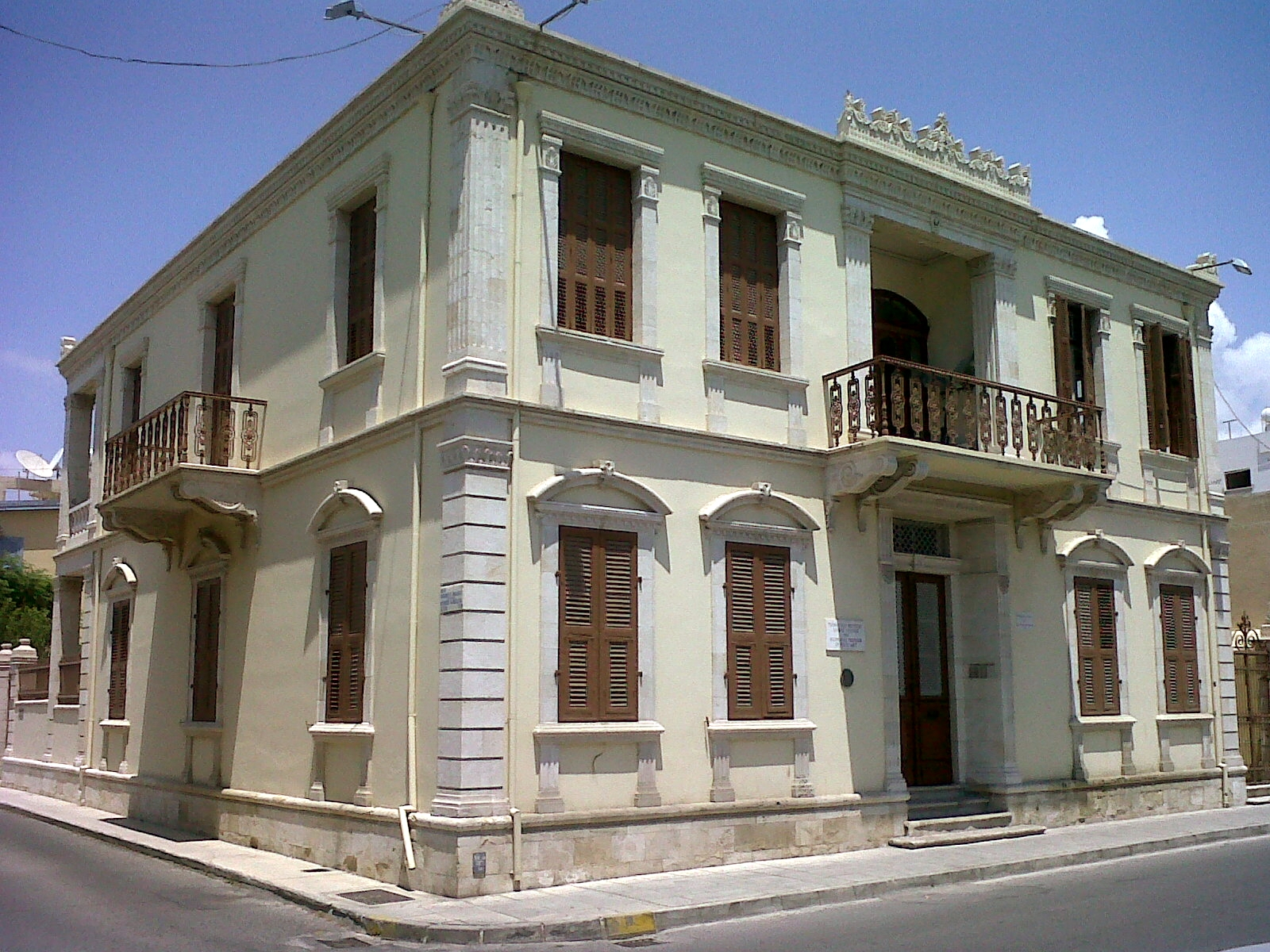
Folk Art Museum

The Folk Art Museum is located in a preserved historic house and features a collection of Cypriot folk art from the past two centuries. The collection includes national costumes, tapestries, embroidery, wooden chests, waistcoats, men's jackets, necklaces, various light garments, town costumes, and rural tools. Established in 1985, the museum houses over 500 exhibits across six rooms. It was awarded the Europa Nostra prize in 1989. Visitors can explore Cypriot culture through these handmade exhibits.

The Archaeological Museum has a collection of antiquities discovered in the district, spanning from the Neolithic Age to the Roman period. Among the notable artifacts are stone axes from the Neolithic and Chalcolithic periods, pottery and objects from the ancient cities of Kourion and Amathus, as well as Roman terracottas, gold jewelry, coins, sculptures, columns, vases, earrings, rings, necklaces, and marble statues. The museum was originally located within the Limassol Castle before being relocated to a site near the Public Gardens.

Since 2024 the non-profit PSI Foundation established in an old carob warehouse located in the industrial area of Limassol hosts exhibitions of modern and contemporary art as well as history of Cyprus. First exhibition dedicated to 50th anniversary of the invasion, "Casts of an Island 2024", was proclaimed "Cultural Event of the Year" by Thoukis awards.

=== Parks ===
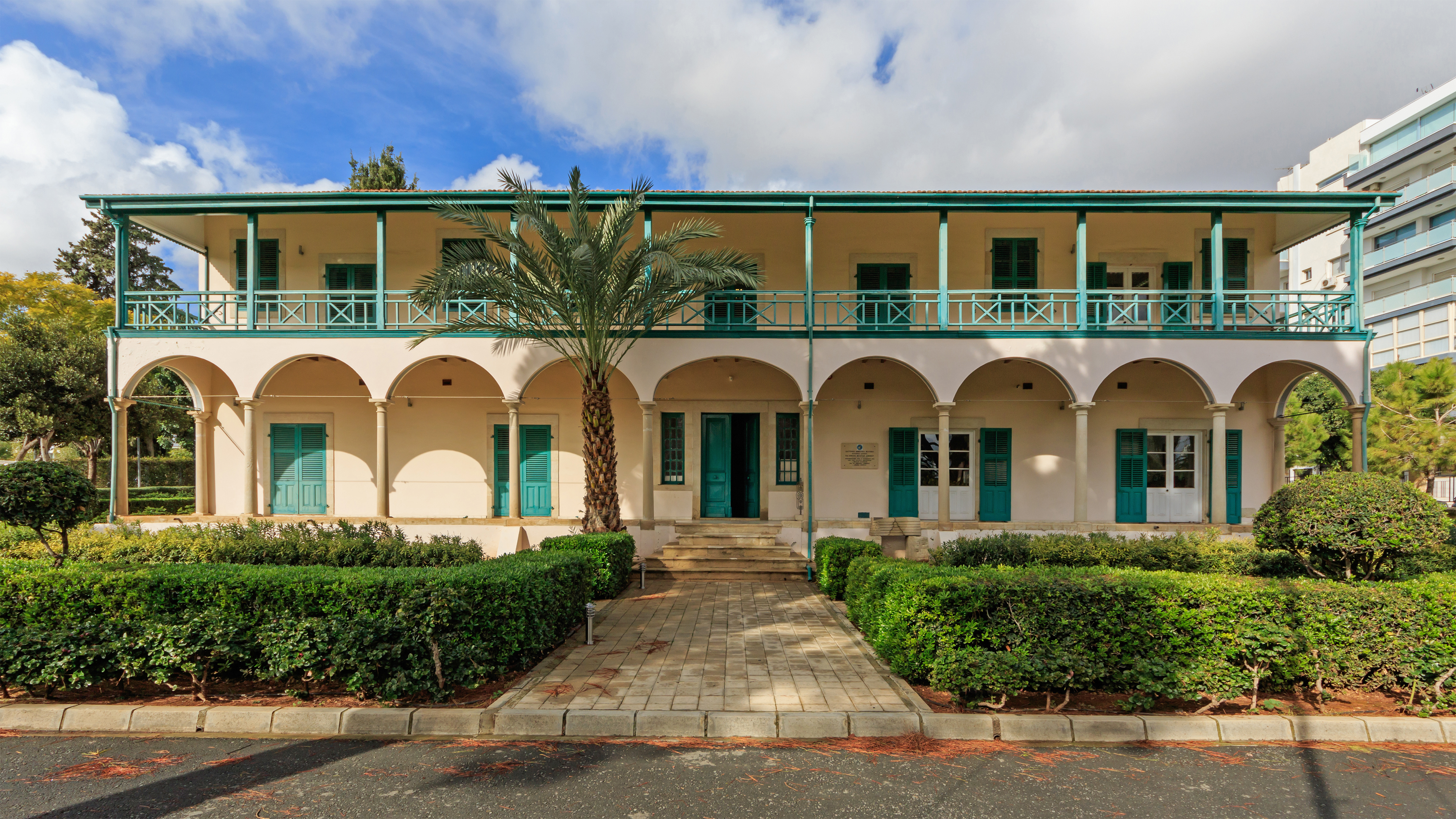
Patticheio Municipal Museum

The Limassol Public Gardens, located along the coastal road, boasts a diverse array of vegetation, including eucalyptus trees, pine trees, and cypresses. Within the garden, is the Limassol Zoo, which houses deer, moufflons, ostriches, pheasants, tigers, lions, monkeys, vultures, pelicans, flamingos and various other animals and birds. The Patticheio Municipal Museum and an open theatre, which was renovated to host international performances, are also within the gardens.

The Limassol Molos, a multifunctional seaside park from reclaimed land that spans one-kilometre (0.62-mile), is one of the city's largest hotspots, as well as one of the largest parks on the island. Fishing, kayaking and many other watersports can be done off the piers of the park. The Limassol Sculpture Park, commissioned by the Limassol Municipality, can be found at Molos. The sculptures were created by Costas Dikefalos, Thodoros Papayiannis, Vassilis Vassili and Kyriakos Rokos from Greece, Helene Black from Cyprus, and more.

== Culture ==
=== Festivals ===
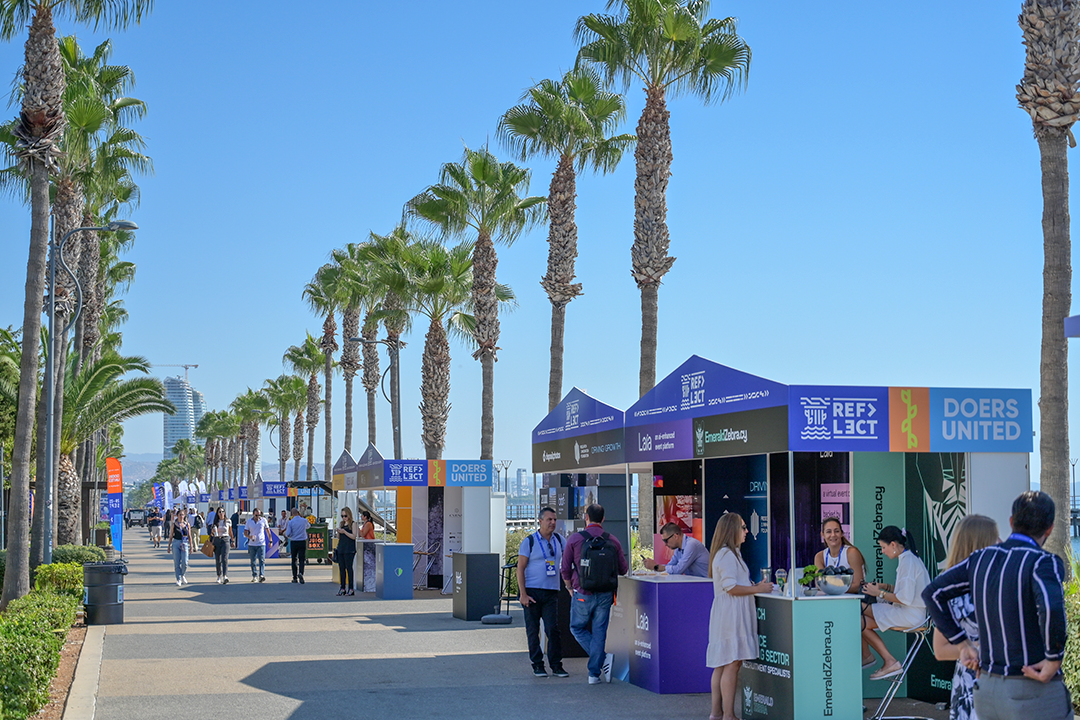
Reflect Festival 2023 stands at Limassol Molos

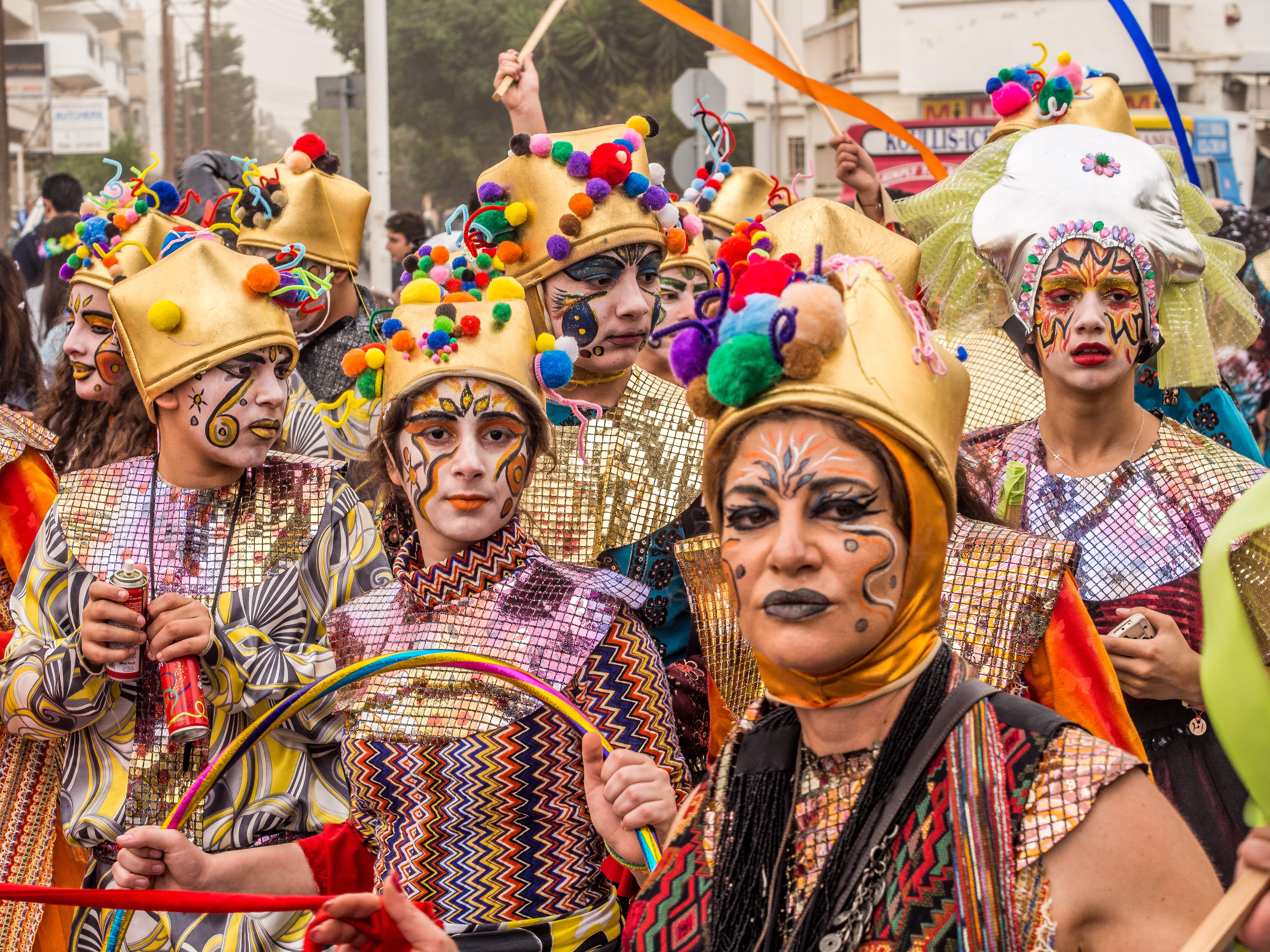
Costumes in the 2014 Limassol Carnival

Limassol hosts several major festivals in Cyprus, including the Carnival and Wine Festival. The Limassol Carnival, a ten-day event filled with masquerades, has ancient roots tracing back to pagan rituals. It has evolved into a purely entertaining spectacle with widespread popularity. The festivities kick off with the entrance parade of the King (or Queen) Carnival, followed by a children's fancy-dress competition. The Grand Carnival parade on Makariou Avenue attracts large crowds from across the island, who come to watch the floats, serenades, and various masqueraded groups. Each night, numerous hotels host fancy-dress balls and parties.

In early October, the Wine Festival of Cyprus takes place in the Limassol Public Gardens, running every evening from 08:00 to 23:00. During this festival, visitors can sample some of the finest Cypriot wines free of charge. The event also features folk dancing performances by groups from Cyprus and abroad, as well as choir performances and other entertainment.

Other notable festivals in Limassol include the Limassol Street Life Festival and the Flower Festival (Anthestiria) in May, the Flood Festival (Kataklysmos) and Shakespeare Festival in June, and the Festival of Ancient Greek Drama.

Additionally, Limassol introduced its first beer festival in July 2003. This three-day seaside dance festival in the city center offers a variety of Cypriot and imported beers. The festival is free to enter, with beers sold at low prices and a mix of international music providing the soundtrack.

Limassol also hosted the sixth Junior Eurovision Song Contest at the Spyros Kyprianou Athletic Centre.

=== Sports ===
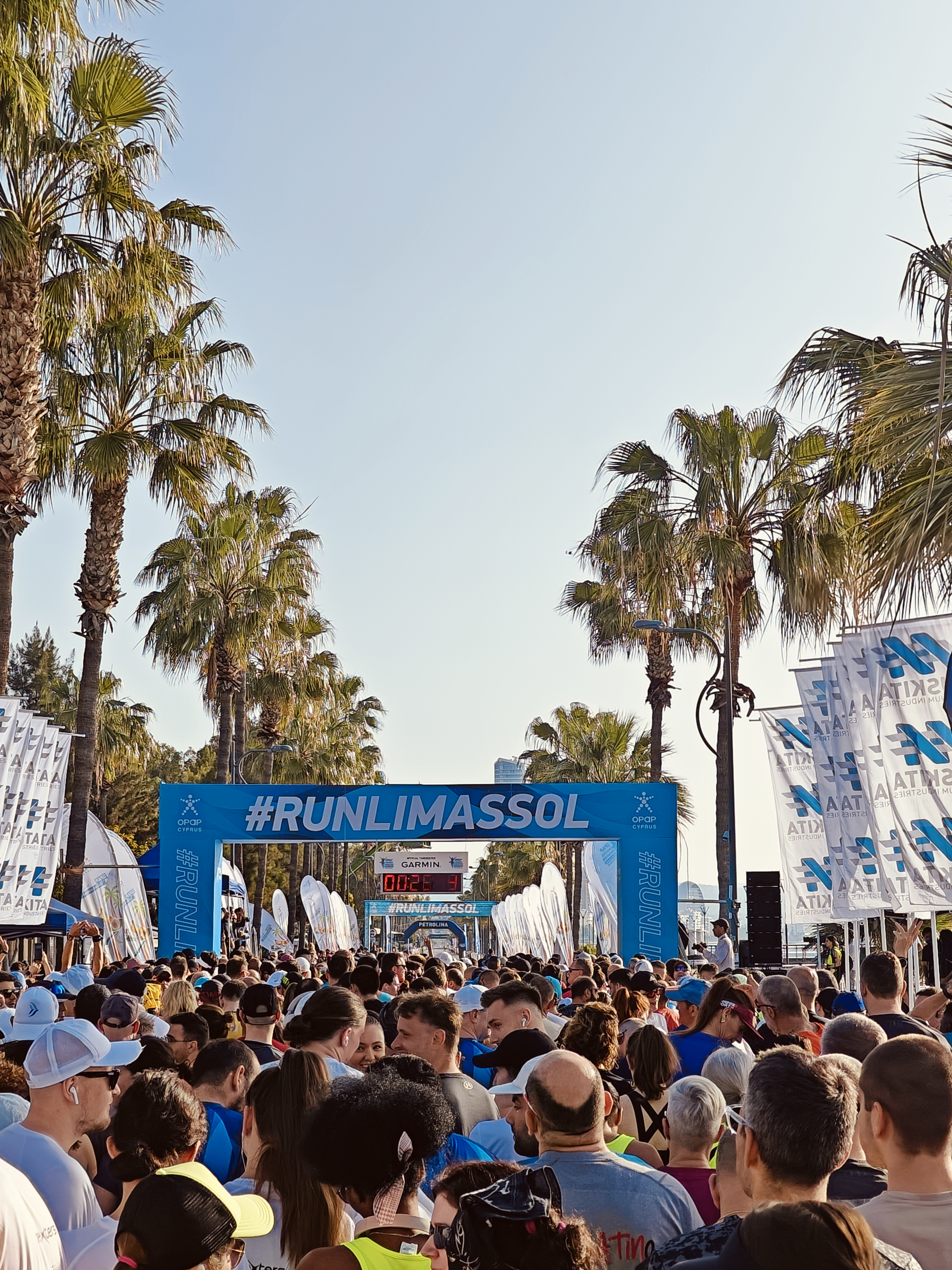
Queue of participants at the starting line of the 2024 Limassol Marathon at Limassol Molos

The Alphamega Stadium, also known as the Limassol Stadium, is the second largest football only stadium on the island. With a capacity of 11,000, it is the home of the city's three major football clubs in the city, AEL FC, Apollon FC and Aris FC. The two former ones are the largest sport clubs in Limassol, which have football, basketball, and volleyball teams, as well as other sports. In football, all three teams play in the First Division. AEL FC and Aris FC were two of the eight founding members of the Cyprus Football Association (CFA). There are also many other teams in athletics, bowling, cycling, and other sports.

The Tsirio Stadium with a capacity of 13,331, was the home base of the three aforementioned football teams of Limassol as well as the Cyprus national football team in the past. It is also used for athletics. Other than the two previously mentioned stadiums, many others also exist in the city.

The Apollon Limassol Basketball Stadium, hosted the 2003 FIBA Europe South Regional Challenge Cup Final Four. The Apollon BC and the AEL BC competed, with the latter becoming the first Cypriot sport team to win a European Trophy. In 2006, Limassol hosted the FIBA Europe All Star Game in Spyros Kiprianou Sports Centre, as it had the year before. The Cyprus Rally which was hosted for the World Rally Championship and the Intercontinental Rally Challenge were both hosted in the Limassol district. In 2025, Limassol co-hosted the EuroBasket.

The Limassol Marathon is part of an annual race series which takes place in Limassol. It was first run in 2006 and is still organised to this day. 2024 was a key year for the marathon since the participation record was broken with over 17,000 runners from more than 70 countries around the world participating. There are various races including a marathon, a half marathon, a 10-kilometre (6.2-mile) Energy Race, a 5-kilometre (3.1-mile) Corporate Race and a 1-kilometre (0.62-mile) Youth Race.

Limassol also has an independent civilian rugby union team, the Limassol Crusaders, who play at the AEK Achileas Stadium and participate in the Joint Services Rugby League. There is a professional handball team, APEN Agiou Athanasiou.

Rowing and canoeing are rapidly becoming very popular in Limassol, due to the three nautical clubs in the city of Limassol. The Germasoyia dam is the place for both practising and competitions.

== Government and politics ==
=== Politics ===
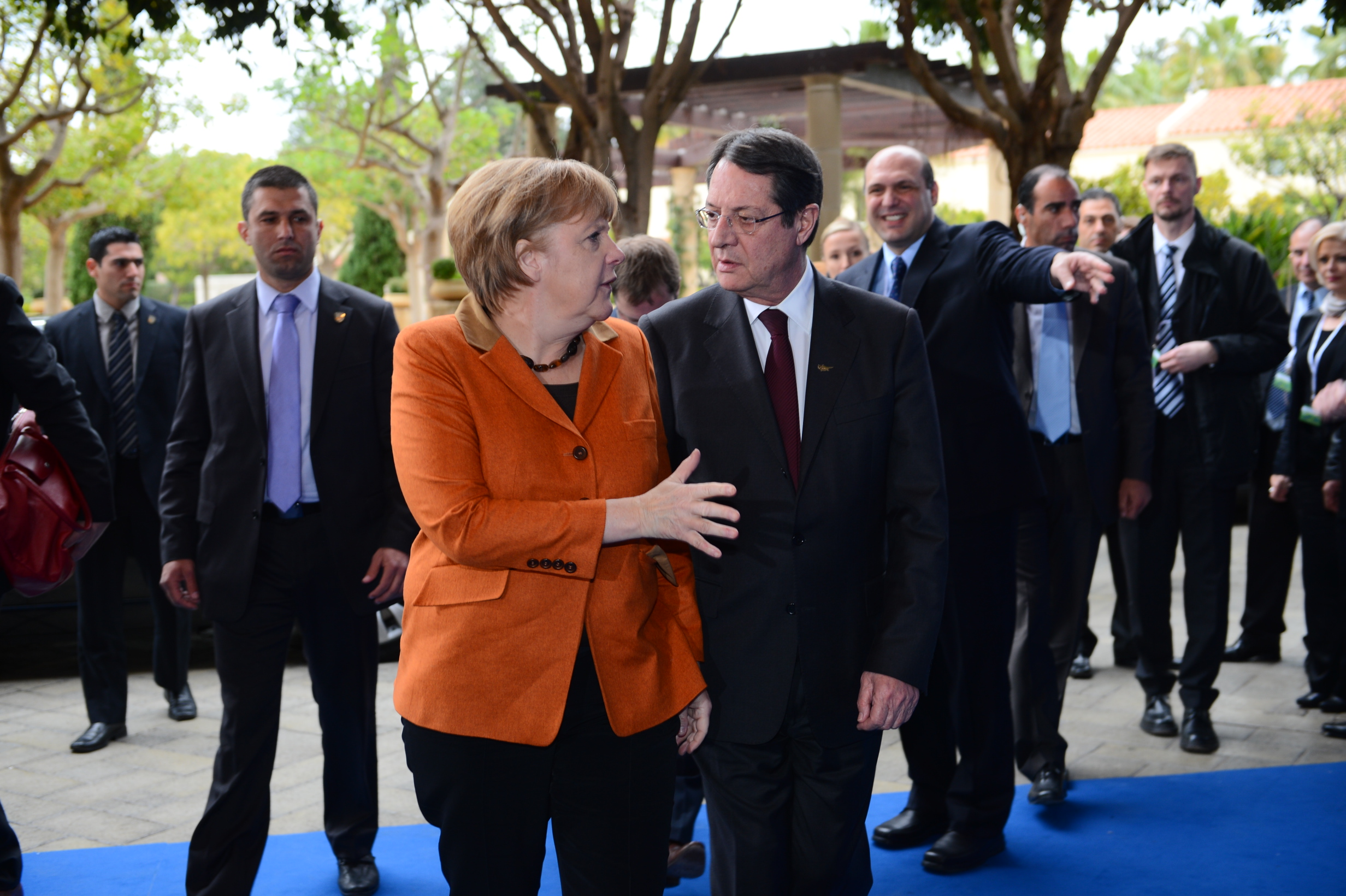
Angela Merkel and Nicos Anastasiades attending the EPP summit in Limassol in 2013

The first Marxist groups in Cyprus formed in Limassol in the early 1920s; in 1926, the Communist party of Cyprus was formed in the city. Its successor, the Progressive Party of Working People (AKEL), has dominated municipal elections since the first free elections in 1943, won by Ploutis Servas.

The European People's Party held an extraordinary party summit in Limassol in 2013. The list of participants in the summit included European Council members, government representatives, European Commission representatives, opposition members and leaders, and European Parliament representatives. The summit's agenda included topics such as the EU's multi-annual financial framework for the period 2014–2020 and the preparation for the 2014 European elections. Andreas Christou, an AKEL member, was re-elected mayor of Limassol in December 2011 to serve his second five-year term.

=== Local Government Reform ===
Following local government reform in 2024 there were a number of administrative changes.

The table below lists the new municipalities and the previous authorities from which they are composed, which now become municipal districts with deputy mayors.

District	New Municipality	Municipal District	Pop 2021	Pre	No.Cllrs(*)
Limassol	EAST LIMASSOL	TOTAL	42,936		24
Limassol	East Limassol	Akrounta	521	C	1
Limassol	East Limassol	Armenochori	211	C	1
Limassol	East Limassol	Ayios Athanasios	16,563	M	8
Limassol	East Limassol	Ayios Tychon	4,413	C	2
Limassol	East Limassol	Foinikaria	460	C	1
Limassol	East Limassol	Mathikoloni	200	C	1
Limassol	East Limassol	Mouttayiaka	3,243	C	3
Limassol	East Limassol	Yermasoyeia	17,325	M	7
Limassol	LIMASSOL	TOTAL	124,106		30
Limassol	Limassol	Limassol	108,105	M	24
Limassol	Limassol	Mesa Yeitonia	15,949	M	5
Limassol	Limassol	Tserkezoi	52	C	1
Limassol	POLEMIDIA	TOTAL	26,650		20
Limassol	Polemidia	Kato Polemidia	23,231	M	16
Limassol	Polemidia	Pano Polemidia	3,419	C	4
Limassol	WEST LIMASSOL	TOTAL	34,752		20
Limassol	West Limassol	Akrotiri	933	C	1
Limassol	West Limassol	Asomatos	893	C	1
Limassol	West Limassol	Episkopi	4,111	C	3
Limassol	West Limassol	Erimi	3,156	C	2
Limassol	West Limassol	Kantou	412	C	1
Limassol	West Limassol	Kolossi	6,478	C	3
Limassol	West Limassol	Sotira	234	C	1
Limassol	West Limassol	Trachoni	4,569	C	3
Limassol	West Limassol	Ypsonas	13,966	M	5

Note: Column "Pre" indicates previous status: M (municipality), C (community) or S (settlement)

=== International relations ===
==== Twin towns – sister cities ====
Limassol is twinned with:

- Rhodes, Greece (since 1970)
- Alexandria, Egypt (since 1972)
- Thessaloniki, Greece (since 1984)
- Ioannina, Greece (since 1984)
- Heraklion, Greece (since 1989)
- Niederkassel, Germany (since 1989)
- Marseille, France (since 1992)
- Nanjing, China (since 1992)
- Zakynthos, Greece (since 1998)
- Haifa, Israel (since 2000)
- Patras, Greece (since 2001)

==== Consulates and consulates general ====
As of October 2024, Limassol hosts 6 consulates general and 33 consulates.

- Armenia
- Belgium
- Botswana
- Cape Verde
- Colombia
- Ivory Coast
- Ecuador
- France
- Georgia
- Israel
- Italy
- Latvia
- Lesotho
- Liberia (consulate general)
- Malta (consulate general)
- Mauritius
- Moldova
- Montenegro
- Netherlands
- Nicaragua (consulate general)
- Pakistan
- Palau
- Poland (consulate general)
- Portugal
- Romania
- Saint Lucia
- Samoa
- Senegal
- Sierra Leone (consulate general)
- Slovakia
- Slovenia (consulate general)
- Tanzania
- Togo
- Ukraine
- Vietnam
- Yemen
- Zambia

== See also ==
- Amathus
- Cyprus University of Technology
- Kourion
- Laniteio Lyceum
- Limassol District
- Molos Promenade
- Limassol Salt Lake
- Municipalities in Cyprus
- Shopping malls in Cyprus
- Tallest buildings in Cyprus
- My Mall Limassol
