= 2021 in architecture =

The year 2021 in architecture involved some significant architectural events and new buildings.

== Events ==
- April - Restoration of the Royal Chapel at Versailles in France is completed.
- June 24 - Surfside condominium collapse: A 12-story condominium apartment building in Surfside, Florida, partially collapses leaving 98 confirmed dead.
- October 1, 2021–March 31, 2022 - Expo 2020 in Dubai, United Arab Emirates.
- October 14 - 2021 Kaohsiung tower fire in Taiwan leaves at least 46 dead.
- November 1 - 2021 Lagos high-rise collapse: A luxury apartment block under construction in Ikoyi, Lagos, Nigeria collapses with fatalities.

== Buildings and structures ==
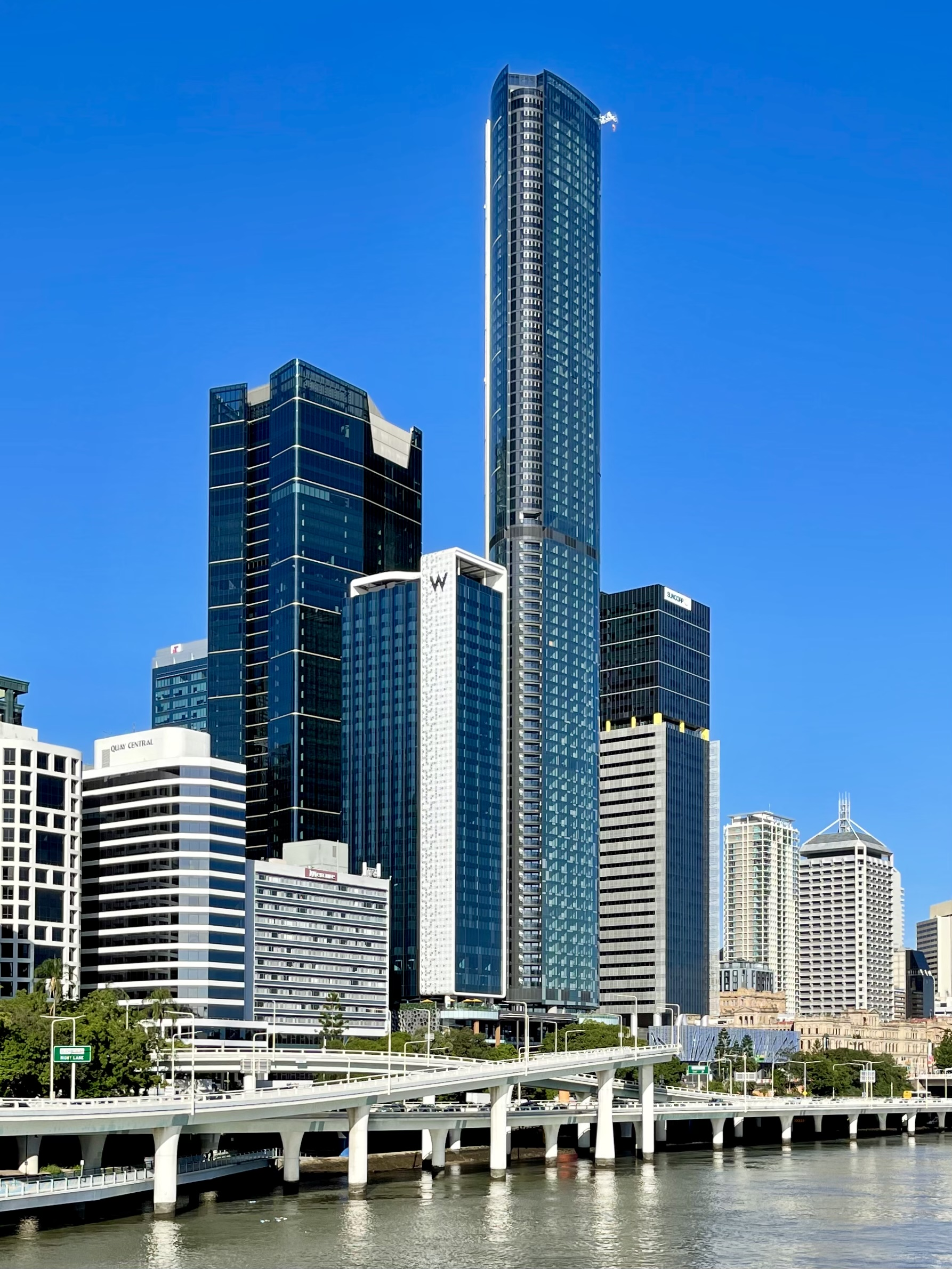
The One in Brisbane in April 2021

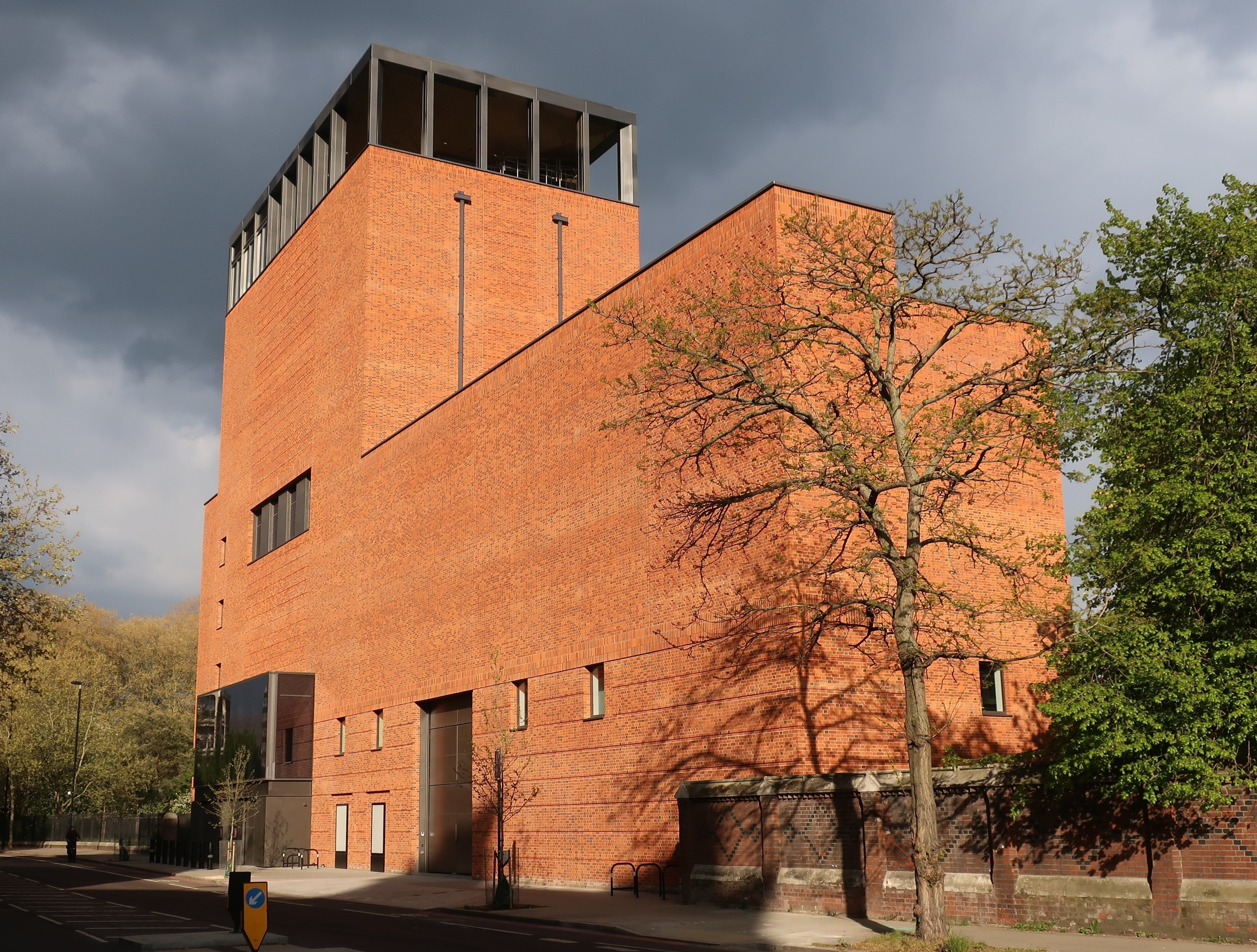
Lambeth Palace Library in London

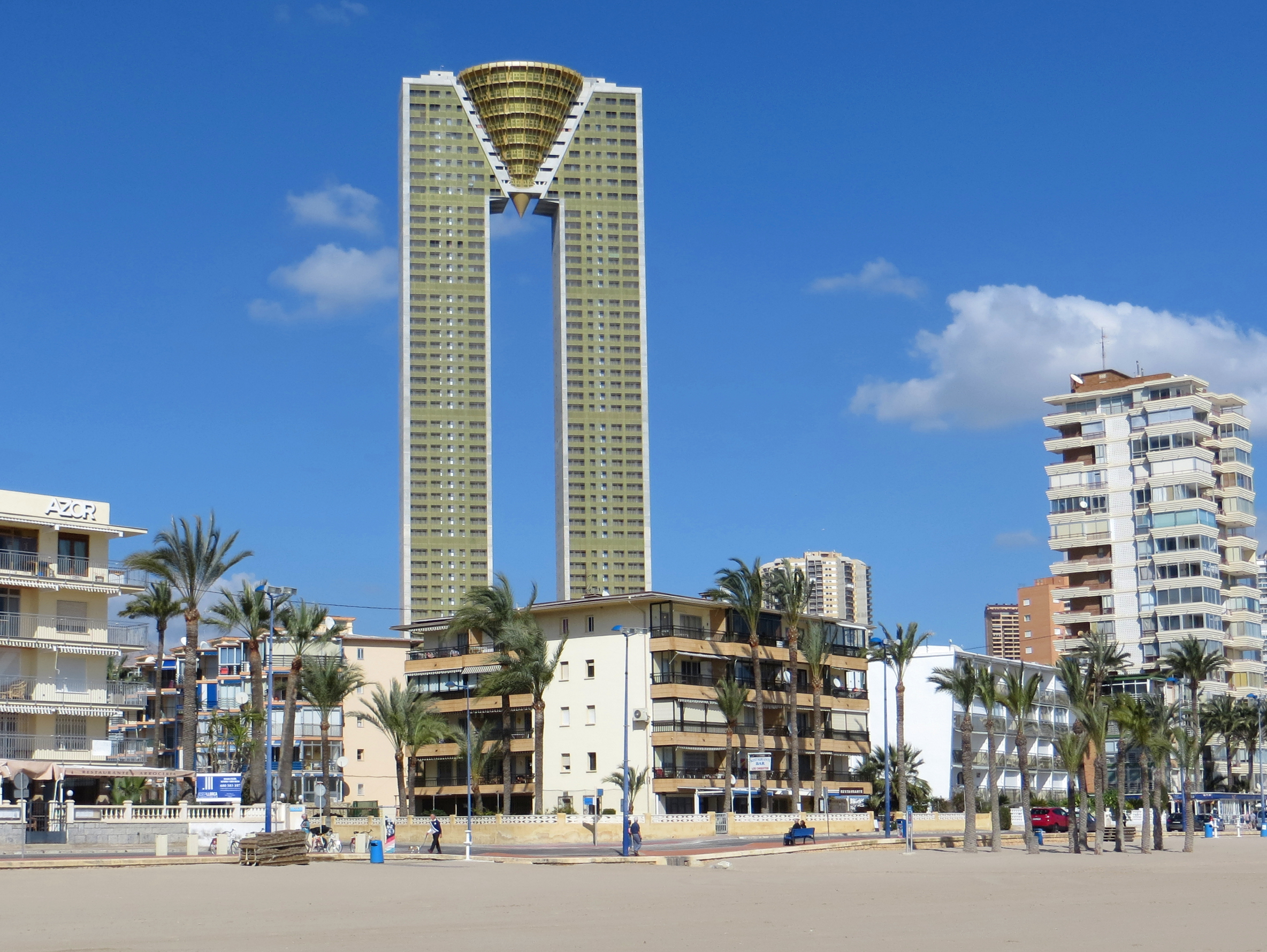
Intempo building in Benidorm

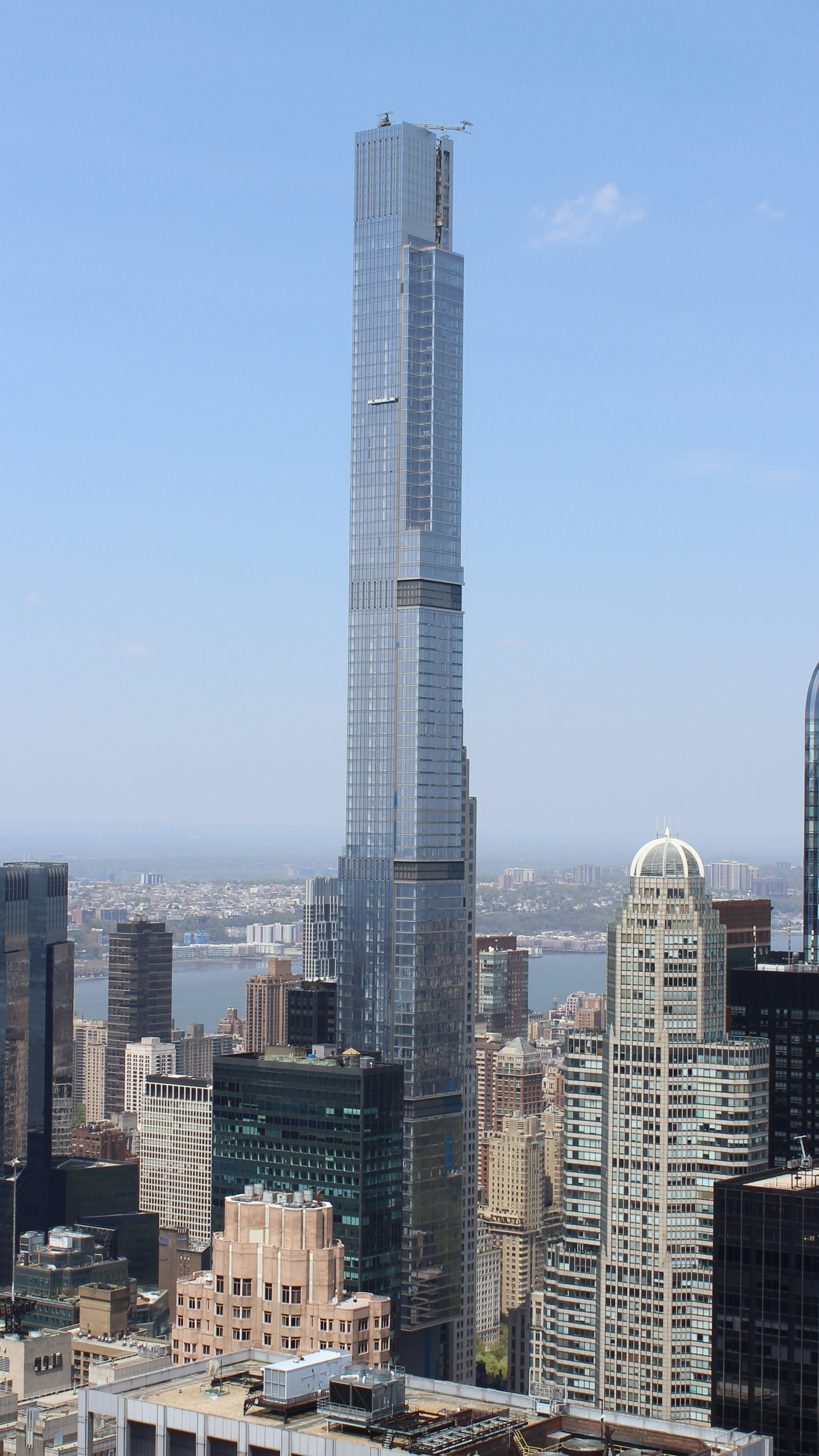
Central Park Tower in New York City in 2021

Australia

- The One, the second tallest building in Brisbane, is completed.

China

- Wormhole library on Hainan, designed by MAD Studio, projected for opening.
- Spot #40 Waste-to-Energy Plant, Shenzhen East, designed by Schmidt Hammer Lassen and Gottlieb Paludan Architects, projected to commence operation.

Cyprus

- One Limassol in Limassol, the tallest building in Cyprus, projected for completion.

Denmark

- Buried extension to Ordrupgaard art gallery near Jægersborg Dyrehave, designed by Snøhetta, projected for completion.

France

- Gallery for Pinault Collection of contemporary art inserted into the Bourse de commerce (Paris), designed by Tadao Ando in collaboration with Niney et Marca Architectes, Pierre-Antoine Gatier and Setec Bâtiment, opening mid-May.
- British Normandy Memorial at Ver-sur-Mer, designed by Liam O'Connor, inaugurated 6 June.
- New façade for La Samaritaine department store in Paris, designed by SANAA, projected for completion in February.
- LUMA Arles arts resource building, designed by Frank Gehry, opens 26 June.
- Le Dôme, a winery in Saint-Émilion, designed by Foster + Partners, projected for completion.

Germany

- Museum Küppersmühle extension in Duisburg, designed by Herzog & de Meuron, projected for completion.

Hungary

- House of Hungarian Music, City Park, Budapest, designed by Sou Fujimoto, projected for completion December.

Indonesia

- Autograph Tower in Jakarta, the tallest building in Indonesia and the Southern Hemisphere, projected for completion.

Italy

- MOSE project intended to protect the city of Venice from flooding, projected for completion.

Netherlands

- Valley, a high-rise residential/mixed-use development in Amsterdam, designed by MVRDV, projected for completion.
- Depot Boijmans Van Beuningen (open museum store), Museumpark, Rotterdam, designed by MVRDV, projected for opening November 6.

Niger

- The Martyrs' Memorial (Le Mémorial des Martyrs), Niamey, Niger, designed by David Adjaye, projected for completion.

Norway

- The new Munch Museum in Oslo, designed by Estudio Herreros, opened October 22.

Poland

- Varso in Warsaw, the tallest building in Warsaw and Poland and in the European Union, projected for completion.

Spain

- Intempo apartment building in Benidorm, completed midyear.
- Caleido, in Madrid

Sweden

- Sara Kulturhus in Skellefteå, designed by White Arkitekter.

Tanzania

- Tanzanite Bridge in Dar es Salaam, the longest bridge in Tanzania, projected for completion.

Thailand

- Bang Sue Grand Station in Bangkok, the largest railway station in Southeast Asia, projected for completion.

United Arab Emirates

- Ain Dubai in Dubai, the tallest ferris wheel in the world, projected for completion.
- Bee'ah Headquarters, a concept by Zaha Hadid Architects, projected for completion.
- The pavilion of Spain at Expo 2020 in Dubai by Amann Cánovas Maruri.

United Kingdom

- Lambeth Palace Library in London, designed by Wright & Wright Architects, projected for official opening.
- New Library, Magdalene College, Cambridge, designed by Niall McLaughlin Architects, awarded Stirling Prize 2022.
- John Morden Centre, day care facility for residents of Morden College retirement homes, Blackheath, London, designed by Mae Architects, completed, awarded Stirling Prize 2023.
- Sands End Arts and Community Centre in Fulham, London, designed by Mae Architects, completed.
- F51, a multistorey skatepark and youth hub in Folkestone, designed by Hollaway Studio, projected for completion November.
- Cherry Groce Memorial Pavilion, Windrush Square, Brixton. Designed by David Adjaye.

United States

- Academy Museum of Motion Pictures, designed by Renzo Piano in Los Angeles, opened to the public on September 30.
- Central Park Tower in New York City, the second tallest skyscraper in the United States and the tallest residential building in the world, designed by Adrian Smith + Gordon Gill Architecture, is completed.
- 111 West 57th Street (Steinway Tower) in New York City, the fifth tallest skyscraper in the United States and the slenderest skyscraper in the world, designed by SHoP Architects, is completed.
- Little Island by Thomas Heatherwick in the Hudson River at Hudson River Park in Manhattan, New York City.
- The Rainier Square Tower, the second-tallest building in Seattle, Washington, is completed.
- Denny Centre, Seattle, Washington, expected to be completed.
- Green House (private residence), Tottenham, London, designed by Hayhurst & Co, is completed.

== Awards ==
- AIA Gold Medal – Edward Mazria
- Architecture Firm Award AIA – Moody Nolan
- Driehaus Architecture Prize for New Classical Architecture – Sebastian Treese
- Emporis Skyscraper Award –
- European Union Prize for Contemporary Architecture (Mies van der Rohe Prize) –
- Grand Prix de l'urbanisme –
- Grand Prix national de l'architecture –
- LEAF Award, Overall Winner –
- Praemium Imperiale Architecture Laureate –
- Pritzker Architecture Prize – Anne Lacaton and Jean-Philippe Vassal
- Prix de l'Équerre d'Argent –
- RAIA Gold Medal – Don Watson
- RIAS Award for Architecture –
- RIBA Royal Gold Medal – Sir David Adjaye
- Stirling Prize - Kingston University Town House, London
- Thomas Jefferson Medal in Architecture – Diébédo Francis Kéré
- Twenty-five Year Award AIA – Will Bruder
- Vincent Scully Prize – Mabel O. Wilson

== Exhibitions ==
- May 22 until November 21 - The Venice Biennale: "How Will We Live Together?"

== Deaths ==
- January 1 - Paige Rense, 91, American editor (Architectural Digest) (born 1929).
- January 18 - Michael Bryce, 82, Australian architect (born 1938).
- January 26 - Richard Holzer, 97, Austrian born Panamanian architect (born 1923).
- March 4 - Hugh Newell Jacobsen, 91, American architect (born 1929).
- March 29 - Constantin Brodzki, 96, Italian-born Belgian architect (CBR Building) (born 1924).
- May 8 - Helmut Jahn, 81, German-American architect (One Liberty Place, Sony Center) (born 1940).
- May 22 - Cornelia Oberlander, 99, Canadian landscape architect (born 1921).
- May 23 - Paulo Mendes da Rocha, 92, Brazilian architect (Serra Dourada Stadium, Pinacoteca do Estado, National Coach Museum), Pritzker Prize winner (2006) (born 1928).
- June 9 - Gottfried Böhm, 101, German architect (Maria, Königin des Friedens), Pritzker Prize winner (1986) (born 1920).
- June 19 - Isaac Fola-Alade, 87, Nigerian architect (1004 Estate) (born 1933).
- June 29 - Émile-José Fettweis, 93, Belgian architect (born 1927).
- July 15 - Gira Sarabhai, 98, Indian architect, co-founder of NID (born 1923).
- October 8 - Owen Luder, 93, British architect (born 1928).
- November 5 - Walter Brune, 95, German architect and urban planner (born 1926)
- November 27 - Ruy Ohtake, 83, Brazilian architect (born 1938).
- November 30 - Oriol Bohigas, 95, Spanish architect (born 1925).
- December 14 - Chris Wilkinson, 76, British architect, co-founder of WilkinsonEyre (born 1945).
- December 17 - Alexander Garvin, 80, American urban planner (born 1941).
- December 18 - Richard Rogers, 88, Italian-born British architect (Centre Pompidou, Lloyd's building, Millennium Dome) (born 1933).

== See also ==
- Timeline of architecture
