= 1933 in architecture =

The year 1933 in architecture involved some significant architectural events and new buildings.

== Events ==
- The Bauhaus school in Berlin is permanently closed by the Nazi government.
- Modern Architectural Research Group (MARS Group) established as a think tank by younger architects and critics involved in the modernist movement in Great Britain.
- Completion of restoration of Herstmonceux Castle in England by Walter Godfrey.

== Buildings and structures ==
=== Buildings opened ===
- February 21 – Nebotičnik skyscraper, Ljubljana, Yugoslavia, designed by Vladimir Šubic.
- July – New Midland Hotel, Morecambe, Lancashire, England, designed by Oliver Hill.
- August 23 – Leeds Civic Hall, Yorkshire, England, designed by Vincent Harris in 1926.
- November 29 – Schwandbach Bridge, Switzerland, designed by Robert Maillart.
- Royal Masonic Hospital (later Ravenscourt Park Hospital) at Ravenscourt Park in London, designed by Thomas S. Tait of Sir John Burnet, Tait and Lorne.
- Labworth Café on Canvey Island, England, designed by engineer Ove Arup.
- 1933 Homes of Tomorrow Exhibition, Chicago

=== Buildings completed ===
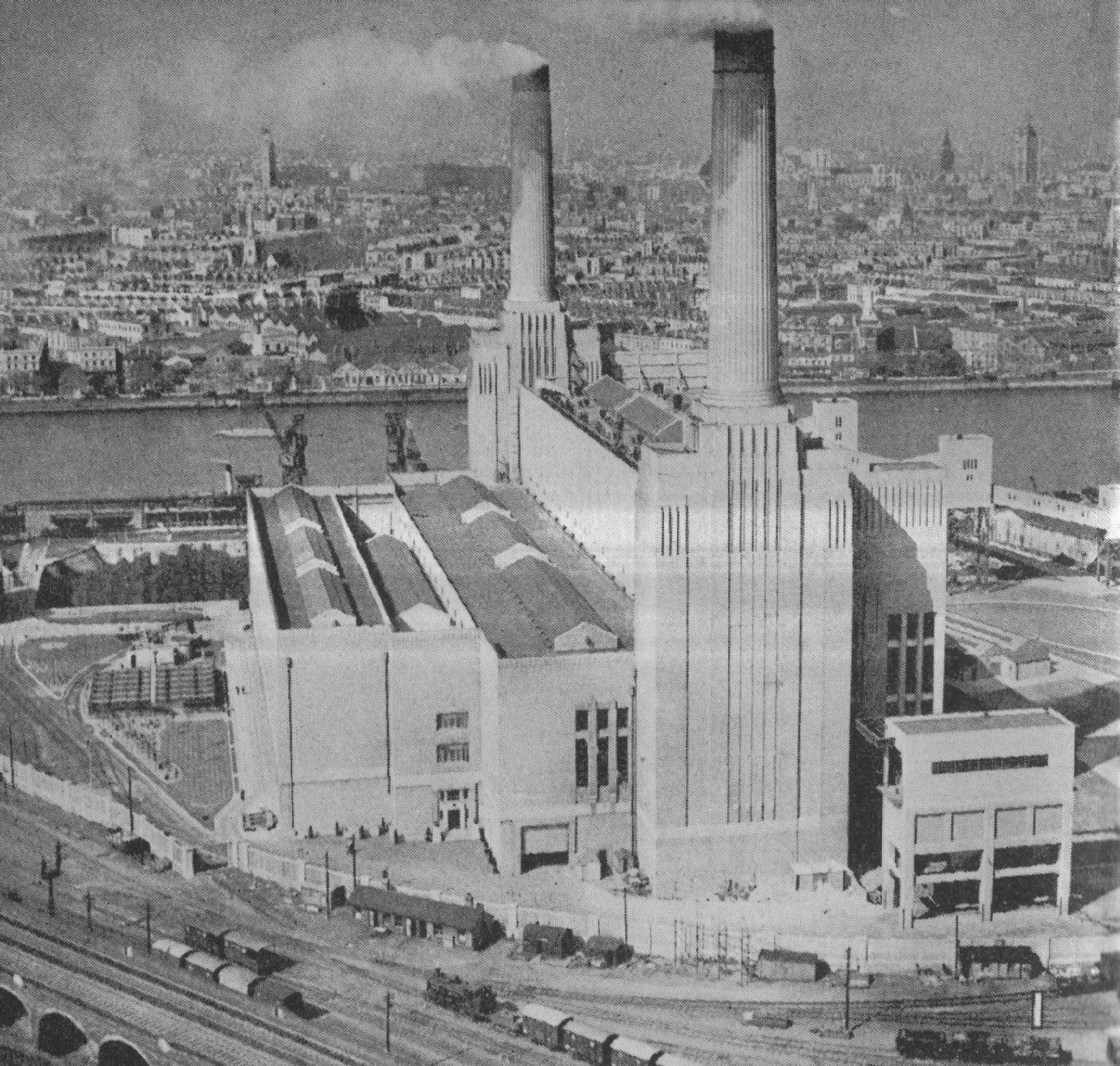
Battersea Power Station, first stage

- St Gabriel's Anglican Church in Blackburn, England, designed by F. X. Velarde.
- Városmajori Roman Catholic church in Budapest, completed by Bertalan Árkay following the death in 1932 of his father Aladár Árkay.
- Myer Emporium renovation, Bourke Street, Melbourne, Australia.
- The Round House, designed by Berthold Lubetkin's Tecton Architectural Group to house gorillas at London Zoo, one of the first modernist buildings in Britain.
- Battersea Power Station, London, with Giles Gilbert Scott as consultant architect, begins operation.
- College Hall, Royal Air Force College Cranwell, England, designed by James Grey West.
- Mardon Hall, first of the University of Exeter Halls of Residence in England, designed by Vincent Harris.
- Darbishire Quad at Somerville College, Oxford, England, designed by Morley Horder.
- Mercado de Abastos de Algeciras (market hall), Spain, designed by Eduardo Torroja.
- Villa Markelius in Stockholm, designed by Sven Markelius for himself.
- Schminke house in Löbau, Germany, designed by Hans Scharoun.
- Engel House, White City (Tel Aviv), Mandatory Palestine, designed by Zeev Rechter.
- Töss Footbridge, Winterthur, Switzerland, designed by Robert Maillart.

== Awards ==
- AIA Gold Medal – Ragnar Östberg.
- RIBA Royal Gold Medal – Charles Reed Peers.
- Grand Prix de Rome, architecture – Alexandre Courtois.

== Publications ==
- John Betjeman – Ghastly Good Taste, or the depressing story of the rise and fall of British architecture.
- The Information Book of Sir John Burnet, Tait & Lorne.

== Births ==
- February 2 – Rodney Gordon, British architect (died 2008)
- June 25 – Álvaro Siza Vieira, Portuguese architect and architectural educator
- July 23
  - Raimund Abraham, Austrian architect (died 2010)
  - Richard Rogers, Italian-born British modernist and functionalist architect (died 2021)
- October 29 – John Andrews, Australian architect (died 2022)
- November 4 – Terje Moe, Norwegian architect (died 2009)
- November 24 - Isaac Fola-Alade, Nigerian architect (1004 Estate) (died 2021)

== Deaths ==
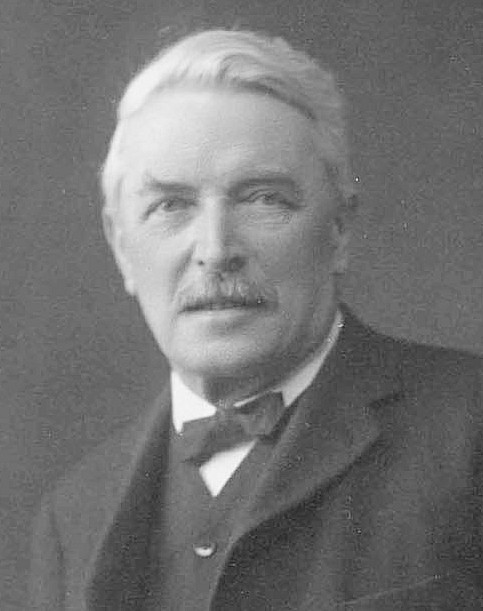
Luca Beltrami

- January – Edward Lippincott Tilton, American architect based in New York (born 1861)
- March 10 – Émile André, French architect, artist and furniture designer (born 1871)
- April 16 – Harold Peto, English architect and garden designer (born 1854)
- August 8
  - Luca Beltrami, Italian architect and architectural historian (born 1854)
  - Adolf Loos, Austrian/Czechoslovak architect and writer (born 1870)
- December 4 – W. G. R. Sprague, British theatre architect (born 1863)
- December 24 – Sir Frank Baines, English architect (born 1877)
