= Trilogy Limassol =

Skyscraper in Limassol, Cyprus

Trilogy Limassol Seafront
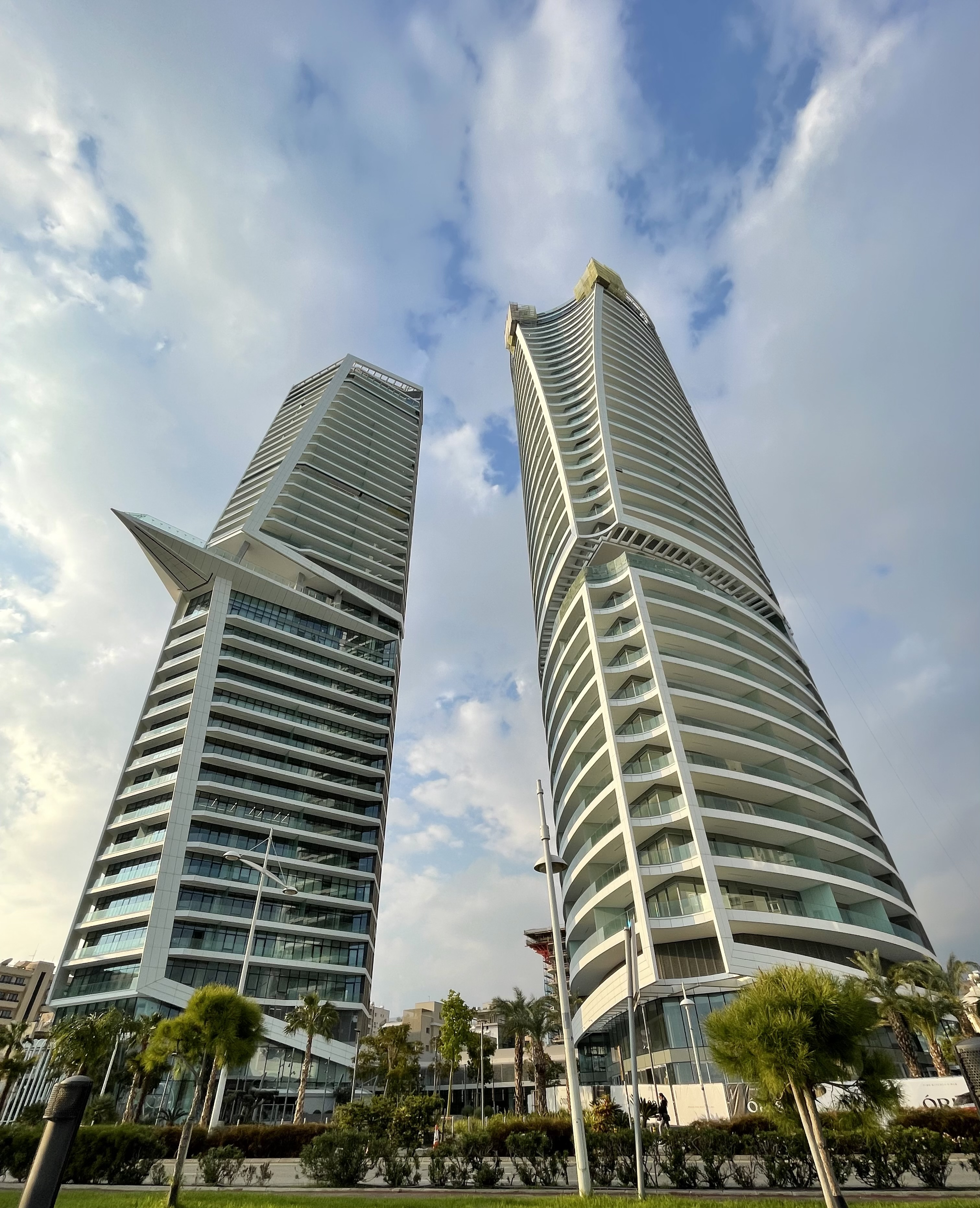
- Interactive map of the Trilogy Limassol Seafront area

General information
- Status: Completed
- Type: Residential
- Location: 28 October Avenue, Limassol, Cyprus
- Coordinates: 34.68593°N 33.06201°E
- Construction started: 2018
- Completed: 2024

Height
- Roof: 170 m (560 ft) (West Tower); 160 m (520 ft) (East Tower)

Technical details
- Structural system: Reinforced concrete
- Floor count: 39 (West Tower); 35 (East Tower)

Design and construction
- Architect: WKK Architects
- Developer: Cybarco Development
- Structural engineer: Thornton Tomasetti

Trilogy Limassol Seafront is a residential skyscraper complex in Limassol, Cyprus. The complex consists of two main towers standing at 170 m (560 ft) tall with 39 floors (West Tower) respectively 160 m (520 ft) with 35 floors (East Tower), with the tallest being the joint-tallest building in Cyprus alongside One Limassol.

== History ==
The project was managed by Cybarco Development and was designed as an urban oasis meant to connect a skyline of towers built in the seashore proximity such as The Oval Tower. The complex was initially planned to feature three towers, however, only two main twin towers were built, with the third one remaining in the second phase of the project. Each tower houses a total of 196 apartment units, penthouses, public plazas, and spa facilities. They are located 150 meters away of the beach.

The towers were built under a podium-structure typology and are covering a floor area of 240,000 m^{2} (2,580,000 sq ft) which include parking spaces, retail areas and plazas. The project cost rises to 300 million €.

== See also ==
- List of tallest buildings in Cyprus
- Limassol
