= Carmen Espegel =

Spanish architect (born 1960)

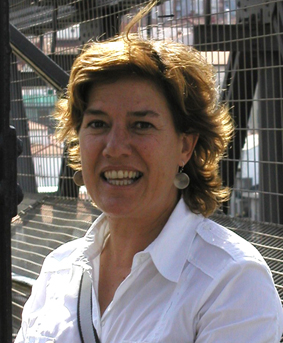
- Carmen Espegel on the Vizcaya Bridge, Spain
- Born: 27 March 1960 (age 66); Palencia, Spain
- Occupation: Architect
- Awards: COAM Award 2013; Milka Bliznakov Prize 2005; ATEG Award 2004
- Practice: espegel arquitectos
- Projects: Reallocated Housing, Embajadores 52, Madrid; Civil Guard Barracks, Oropesa del Mar; Community Park, Palencia

Carmen Espegel Alonso (Palencia, 1960) is a Doctor of Architecture at the Escuela Técnica Superior de Arquitectura de Madrid (Spain), where she teaches Architectural Project classes representing the Espegel Teaching Unit. She has been working at her own studio since 1985 and in 2003 she founded the firm espegel-fisac arquitectos. Her reference work, "Heroines of Space. Women Architects in the Modern Movement" (Spanish: Heroínas del Espacio. Mujeres arquitectos en el Movimiento Moderno), is a theoretical and historical synthesis of the role of women in Architecture.

== Biography ==
Carmen Espegel was born in Palencia and at the age of 16 she moved to Madrid to take el Curso de Orientación Universitaria and start working on her Architecture degree at the Escuela Técnica Superior de Arquitectura de Madrid, which she completed in 1985 with honors.

In 1989 she moved to Belgium, where she lived for three years. During that time, she was working on obtaining a Master of Conservation of Historic Towns and Buildings at KU Leuven University, which she completed in 1995 Magna cum laude, while also working as a Spanish Technical Leader at the European Synchrotron Radiation Facility, ESRF of Grenoble, France.

Upon her return to Spain, she began her Doctorate in Architecture at the ETSAM which successfully ended with her doctoral thesis: "Proyecto E-1027 de Eileen Gray-Jean Badovici: Drama de la Villa Moderna en el Mediterráneo", which won the Award for Outstanding Doctorate 1996–1997.

She has written various books and many articles demonstrating her architectural critical thinking. She has been invited to serve on panels for both national and international architecture contests.

In 1985 she started her architecture career working independently and in 2003 founded the architecture firm espegel-fisac arquitectos alongside Architect Concha Fisac de Ron. She participates in many idea competitions where she wins many awards. Her work has been presented in many different congresses, expositions, and conferences; some of the highlights include her exhibitions at the Pabellón de España (Shanghái), The Royal Institute of British Architects of London (RIBA), and Architekturforum Aedes am Pfefferberg in Berlin. Her work has been included in many books and specialized journals such as El Croquis, Arquitectura Viva, ON, Arquitectura, Pasajes, Arquitectos, Future, and Oris.

Her career is linked together by three interwoven roles: teacher, researcher, and practicing architect.

== Teaching ==
She is currently working as a Professor of Architectural Projects at Escuela Técnica Superior de Arquitectura in Madrid, Spain. She has been a guest lecturer for the doctorate program at Faculdade de Arquitetura da Universidade (Oporto, Portugal), for the Master of Housing Program at la Universidad de Roma III (Rome, Italy), and for the Master of Ephemeral Architecture Program at Escuela Técnica Superior de Arquitectura (Madrid, Spain), among others.

She was a professor of the Master of Advanced Architecture (MPPA) teaching Criticism of Contemporary European Social Housing. She was a professor and on the organizational board for the Master of Collective Housing Program at the Universidad Politécnica de Madrid (Madrid, Spain). She taught the online European doctorate Criticism of Contemporary Social Housing in Europe in English from 2008 to 2011. From 2000 to 2003, she coordinated and taught "PER. Proyectos en Red" in collaboration with Universidad Nacional de Córdoba (Argentina).

She has given lectures in the United States, Brazil, Mexico, Costa Rica, Colombia, Argentina, Belgium, The Netherlands, France, Switzerland, Italy and Portugal that detail: "Lilly Reich: el espíritu del material" (Lilly Reich: the spirit of the material), in "Pioneras de la Arquitectura" cycle at Fundación Juan March, Madrid; "Invitation to an Intellectual Journey. House E.1027 by Eileen Gray and Jean Badivici" Conference at International Archive of Women in Architecture, Virginia Tech 2018; “Social Housing in Spain”, en el American Institute of Architects, New York; "Taxonomia del Espacio Publico" (Taxonomy of Public Space) at the Urban Regeneration Forum BIA, Bilbao, Spain; "A la carta de Atenas-1933" (In the charter of Athens-1933) at the National Theater D. Maria II, Lisbon, Portugal; "Vivienda social en Madrid en el centro histórico siglo XXI" (Social Housing in Madrid's Historical Downtown in the 21st Century), at the University of São Paulo, Brasil; "El sueño de vivir" (The Dream of Living), as part of the City of the Future Lecture Set at Universidad Iberoamericana, Mexico; "Project E-1027" by Eileen Gray and Jean Badovici and "The Drama of a Modern Villa in the Mediterranean" at TU Delft Faculty of Architecture, Delft, Holland.

From 2005 to 2008 she was the assistant director of external relations at the Escuela Técnica Superior de Arquitectura (Madrid, Spain). She was a member of the governance committee and school board from 2004 to 2009. She has been a certified university professor since 2013.

== Research ==
Over the last twenty years her research has focused on three Fundamental branches: Collective housing, Architectural Criticism, and Women and Architecture. She is the head researcher of the Collective Housing Research Group,GIVCO gives doctorate courses at ETSAM (the School of Architecture at the Polytechnic University in Madrid), and leads several doctoral theses.

Some of her many subsidized research projects include:

- Mapping Public Housing: a critical review of the State-subsidized residential architecture in Portugal (1910–1974). Portugal 2015.
- El papel de la vivienda social en los centros urbanos de Madrid y São Paulo. Estrategias de densificación y prácticas sostenibles en Rehabilitación y Obra nueva. Brazil 2013.
- American Heroines of the space: from domestic engineers to modern home. Columbia University of New York. USA 2012.
- Atlas de Vivienda Colectiva Española del Siglo XX. Spain 2012.
- Tipos existentes de Viviendas en el área central de Madrid (Calle-30) y su potencialidad de transformación para viviendas contemporáneas. Spain 2011.
- La Villa urbana substantia de la ciudad mediterránea del siglo XXI. Spain 1993.

== Representative works ==
- 2015 – Town Hall and Cultural Center in collaboration with Fernando Casqueiro and Raimundo Alberich. Gumpoldskirchen, Austria.
- 2015 – Redesign of Tiburtino III Area. Rome, Italy.
- 2011 – Refurbishment of Barquillo 13 building into the National Commission of Energy Headquarters. Madrid, Spain.
- 2011 – Casa Las Hormigas en Collado Villalba, Spain.
- 2010 – Civil Guard Barracks House. Oropesa del Mar, Spain.
- 2009 – Plaza de Mostenses: market, offices, sports space and food court. Madrid, Spain.
- 2008 – 114 price-controlled dwellings at PP I-7 Parcela 15. Fuenlabrada, Spain.
- 2008 – 24 dwellings. Fuenlabrada, Spain.
- 2007 – Mercado de Chamartín remodel. Madrid, Spain.
- 2006 – Office building. Soluble Products. Venta de Baños, Spain.
- 2004 – Remodel and adaptation of El Salón de Isabel II Park in collaboration with Ana Espegel. Palencia, Spain.
- 2003 – Office building renovation at calle Serrano 90. Madrid, Spain.
- 2002 – 23 subsidized dwellings at Embajadores, 52. Madrid, Spain.
- 2002 – Casa de Chapa. Guadarrama, Spain.
- 1999 – PROSOL factory for soluble products. Venta de Baños, Spain.
- 1986 – Commercial Building at calle Mayor 30. Palencia, Spain.

== Gallery ==
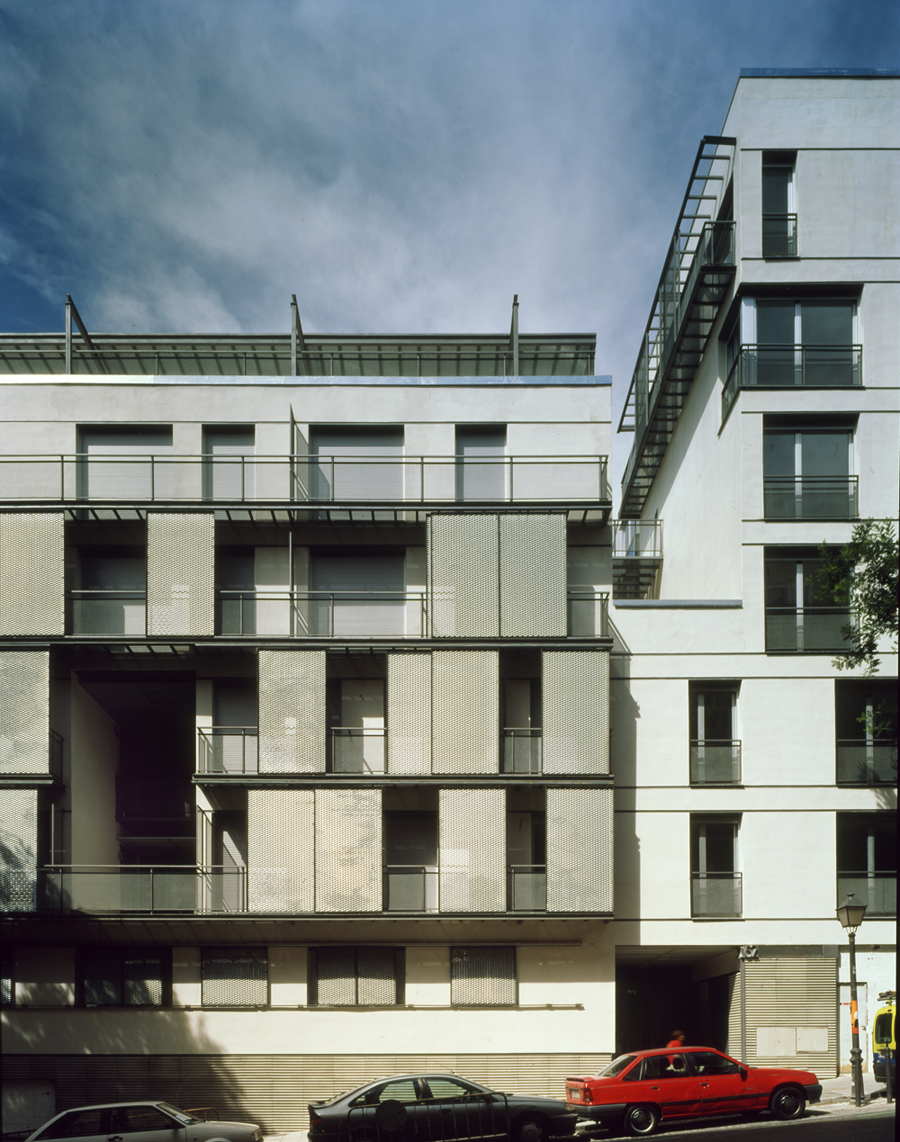
Embajadores 52 Housing
Madrid, Spain

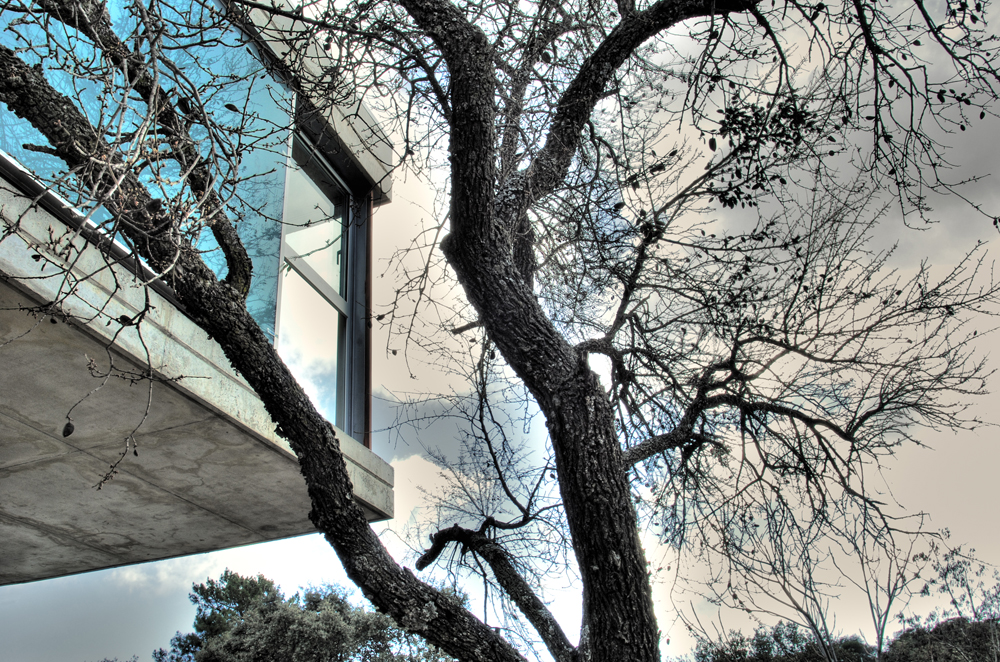
Casa de las Hormigas
Collado Villalba, Spain

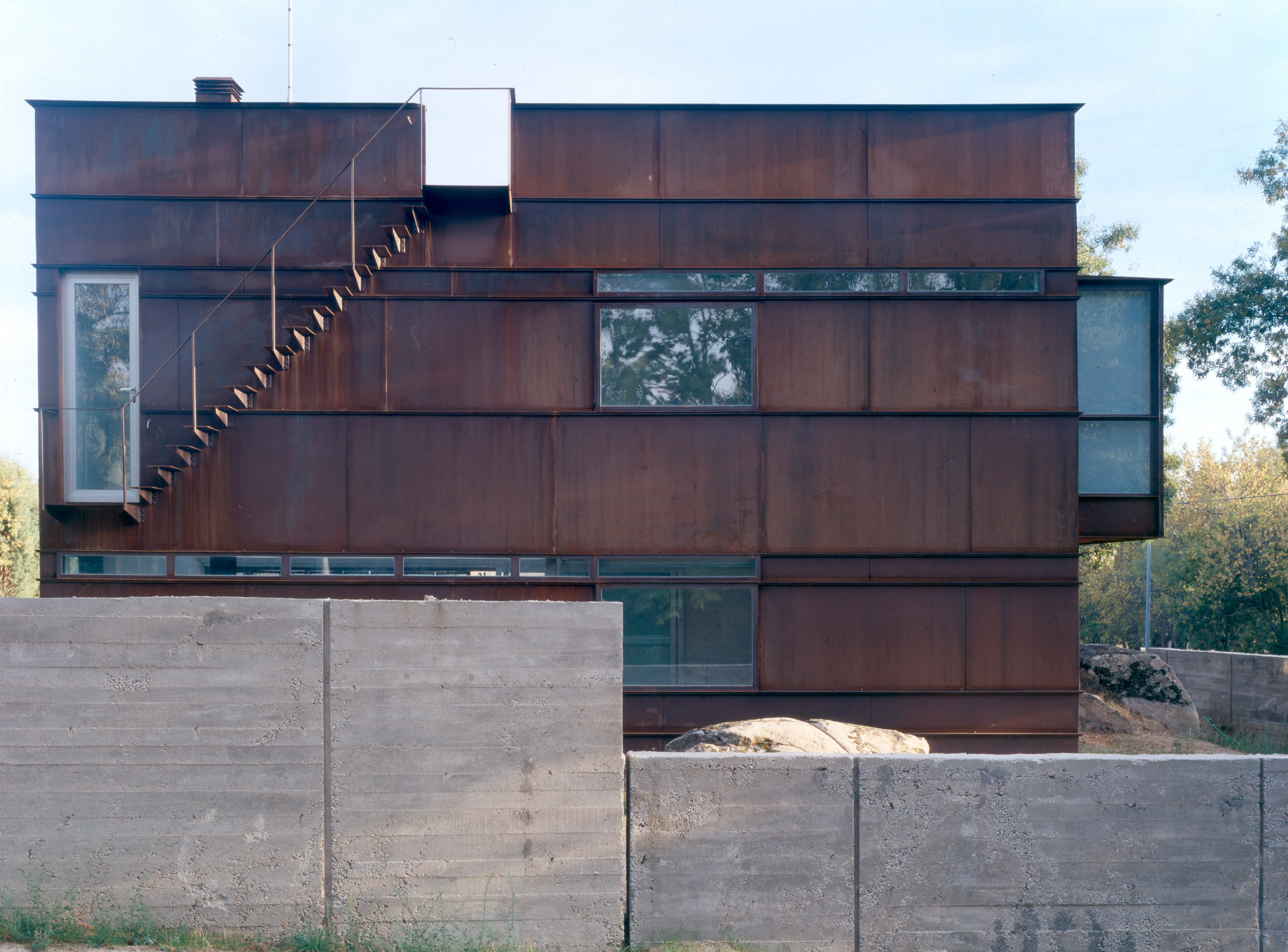
Casa de Chapa
Guadarrama, Spain

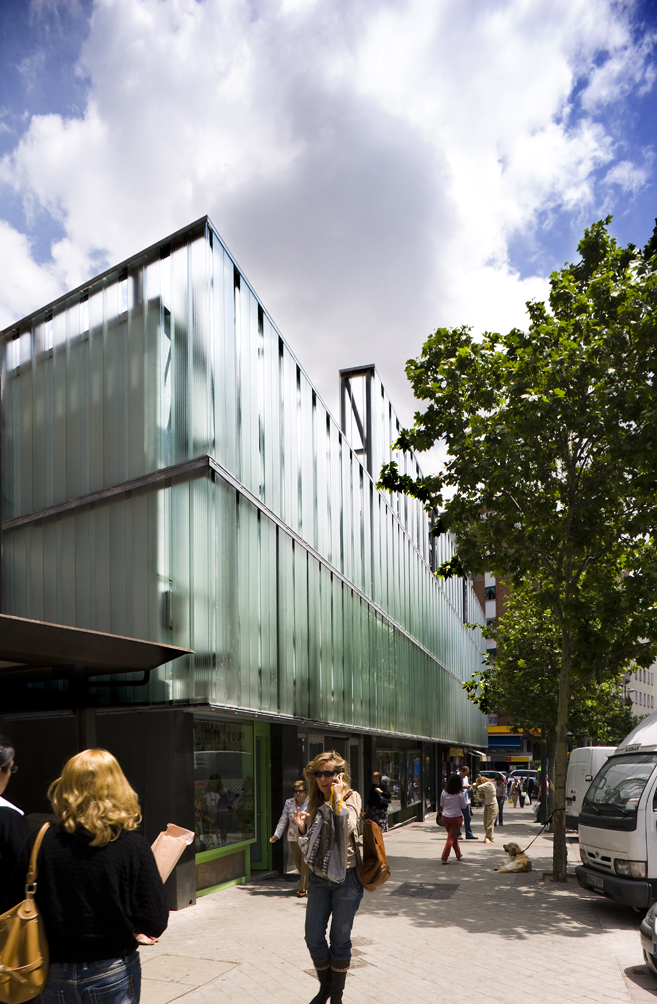
Mercado de Chamartin
Madrid, Spain

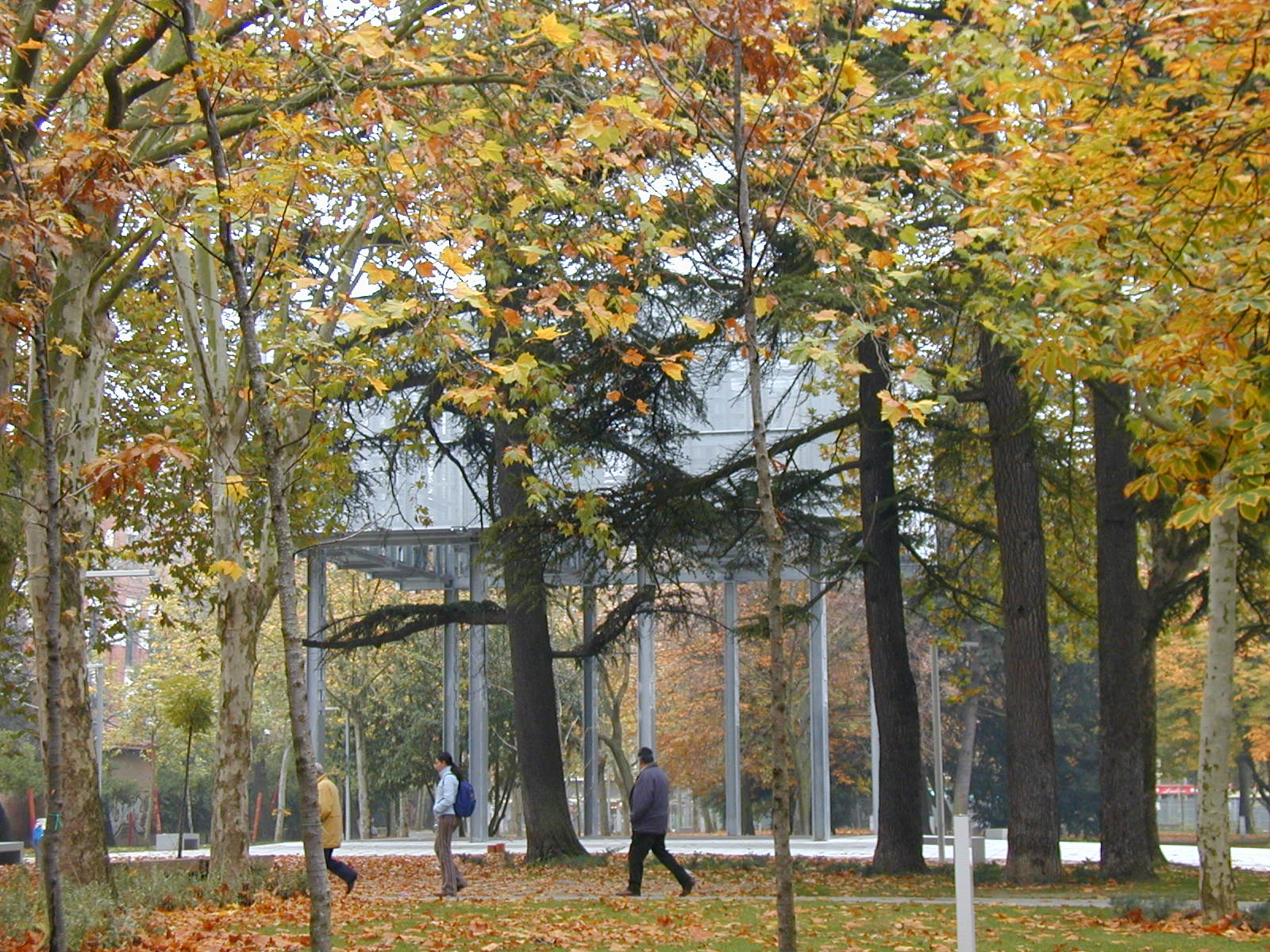
Parque del Salón
Palencia, Spain

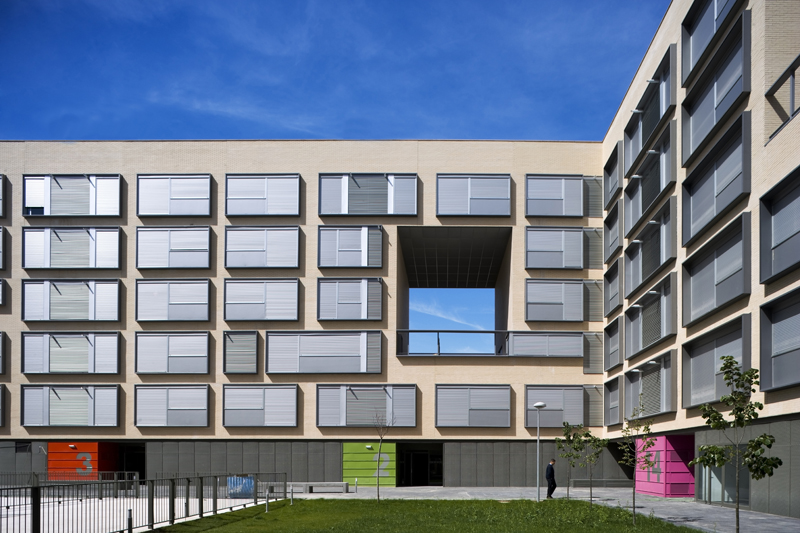
114 dwellings
Fuenlabrada, Spain

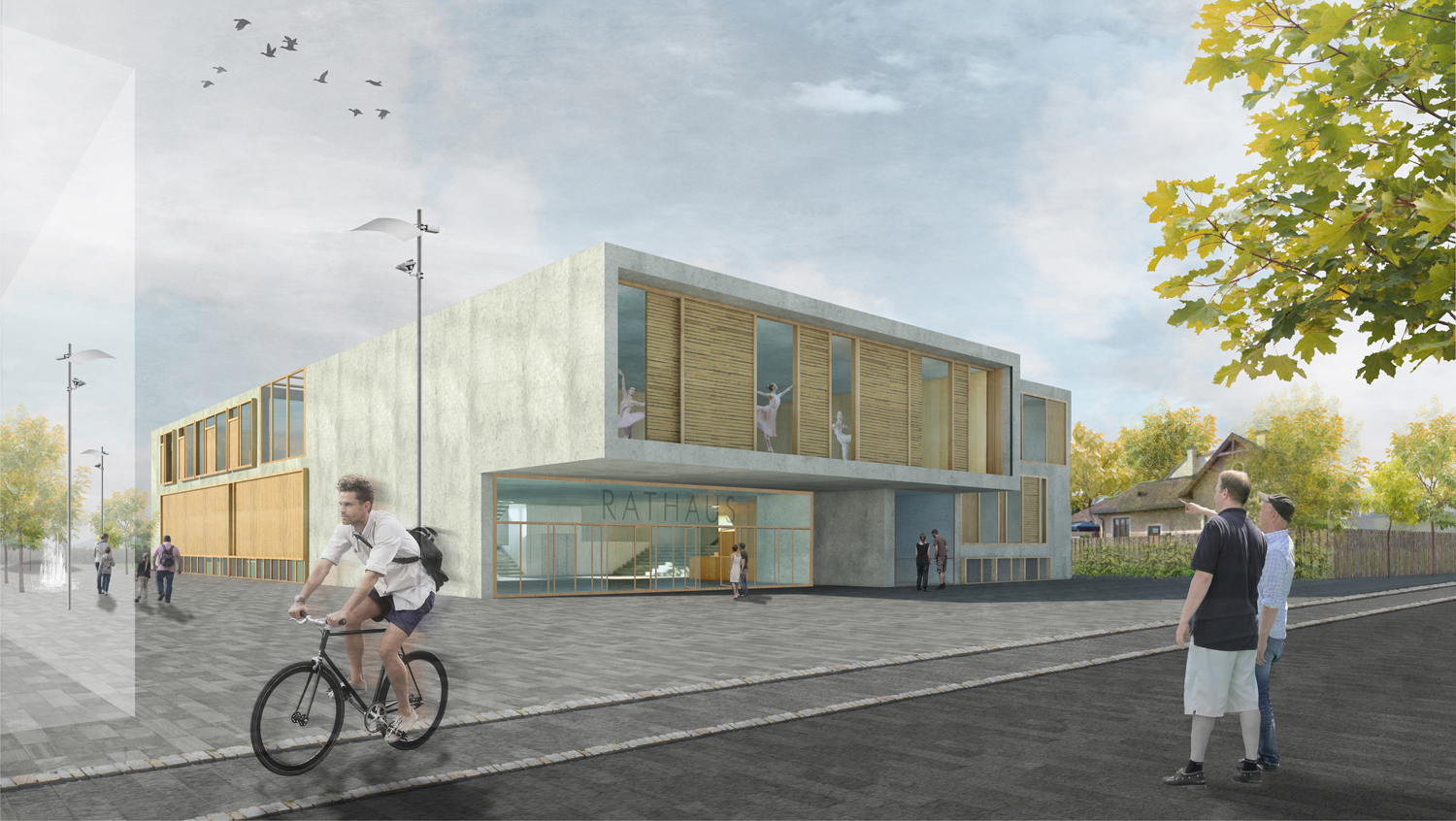
Gumpoldskirchen City Hall
Gumpoldskirchen, Austria

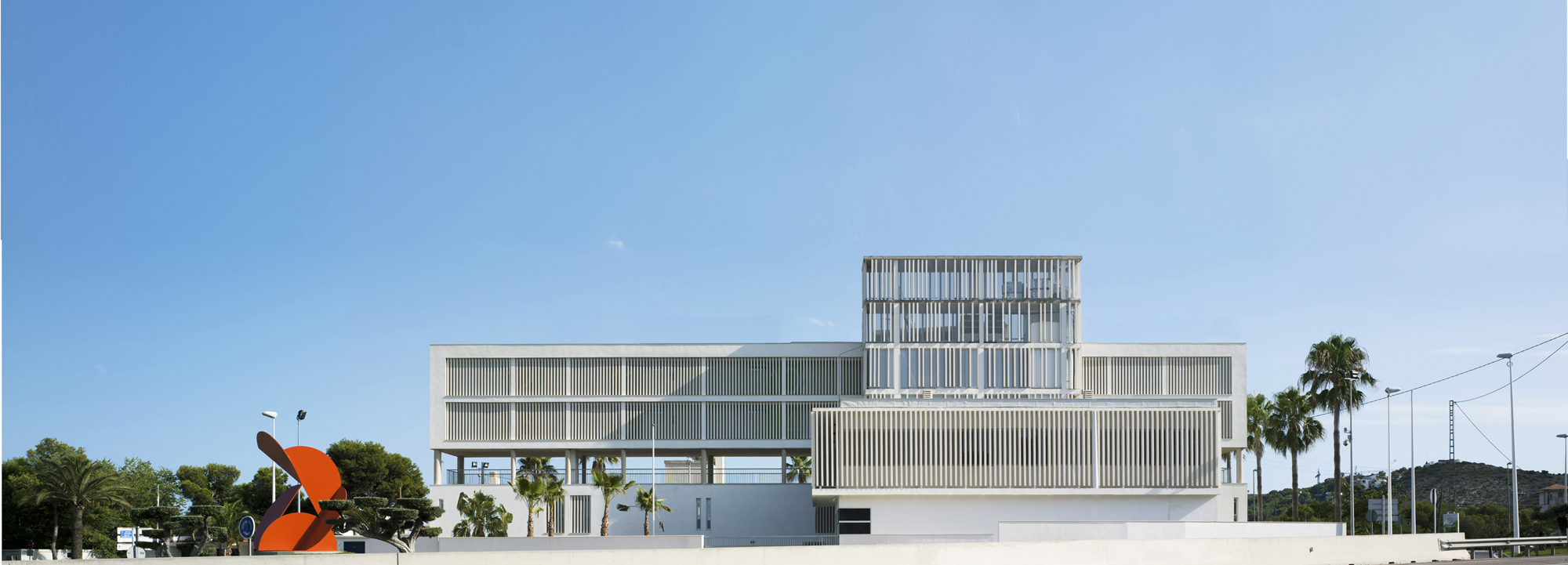
Civil Guard Barracks
Oropesa del Mar, Spain

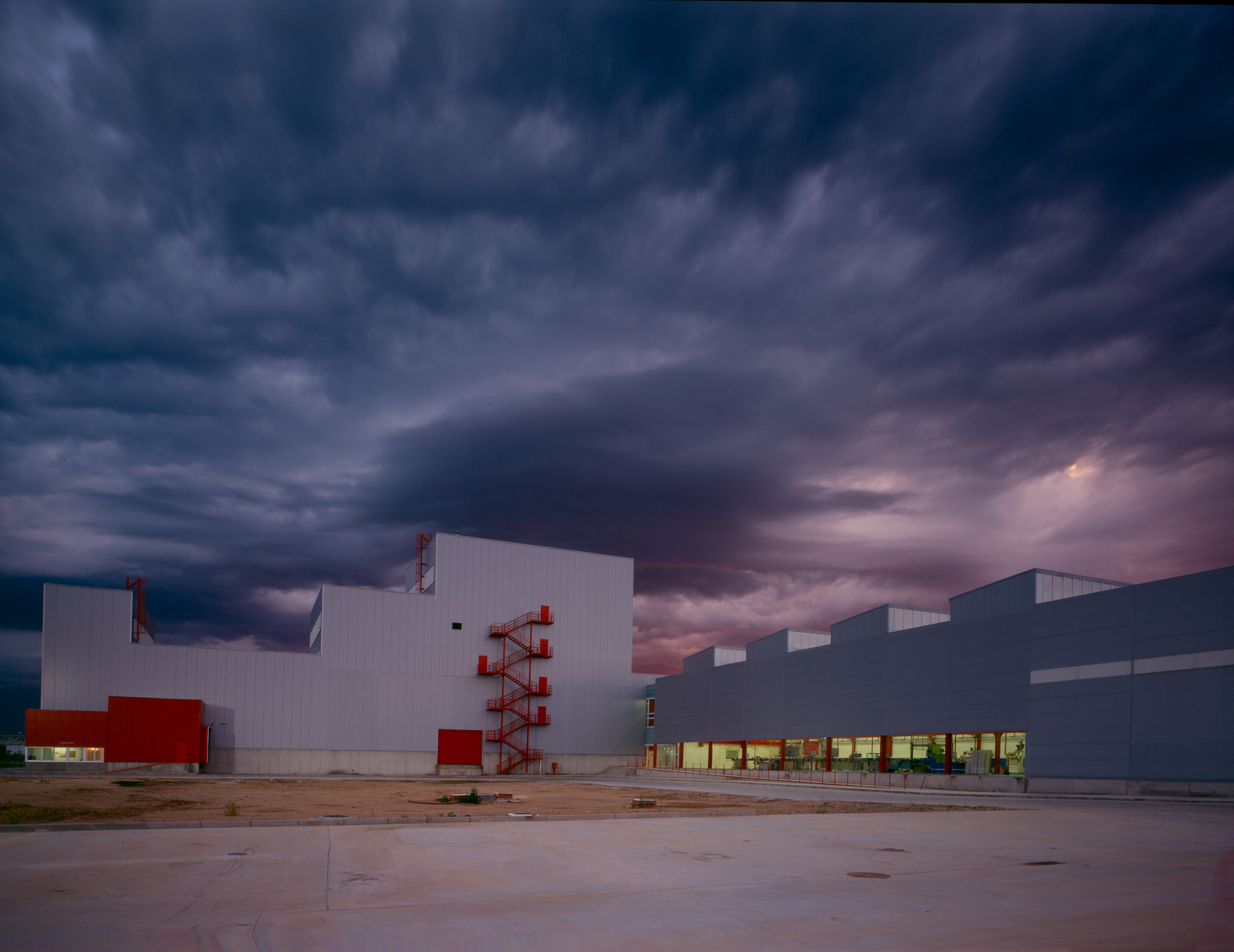
PROSOL Factory
Venta de Baños, Spain

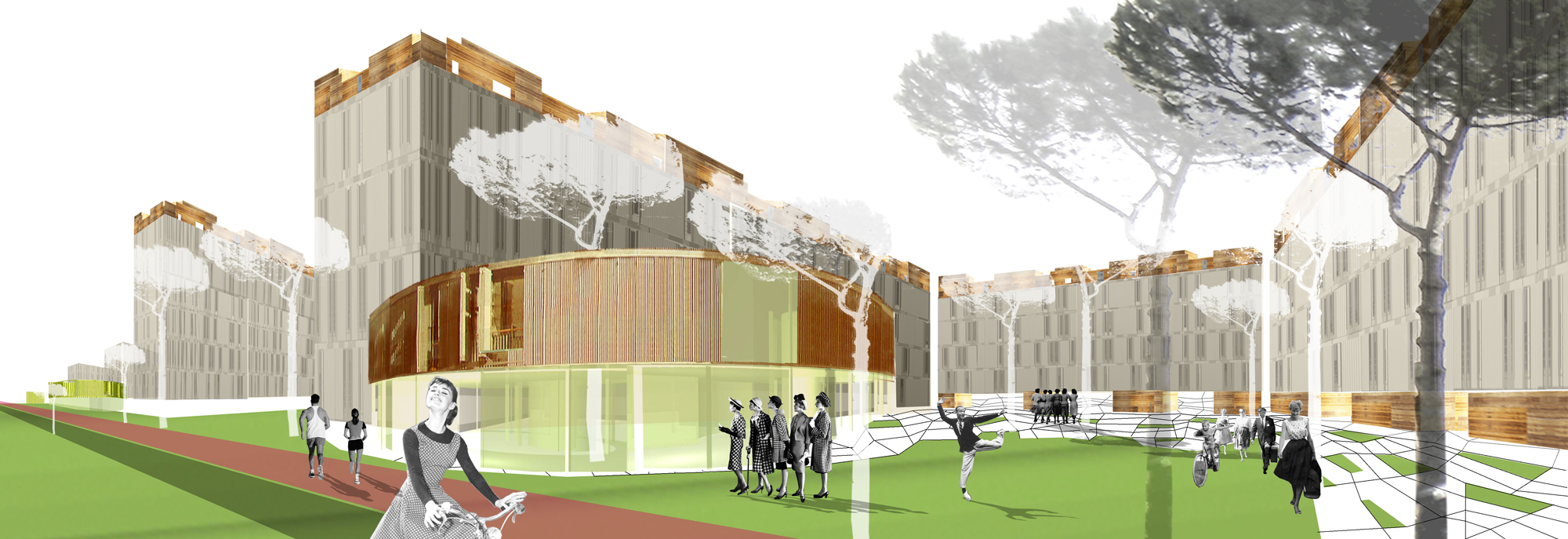
Tiburtino III in Rome
Roma, Italy

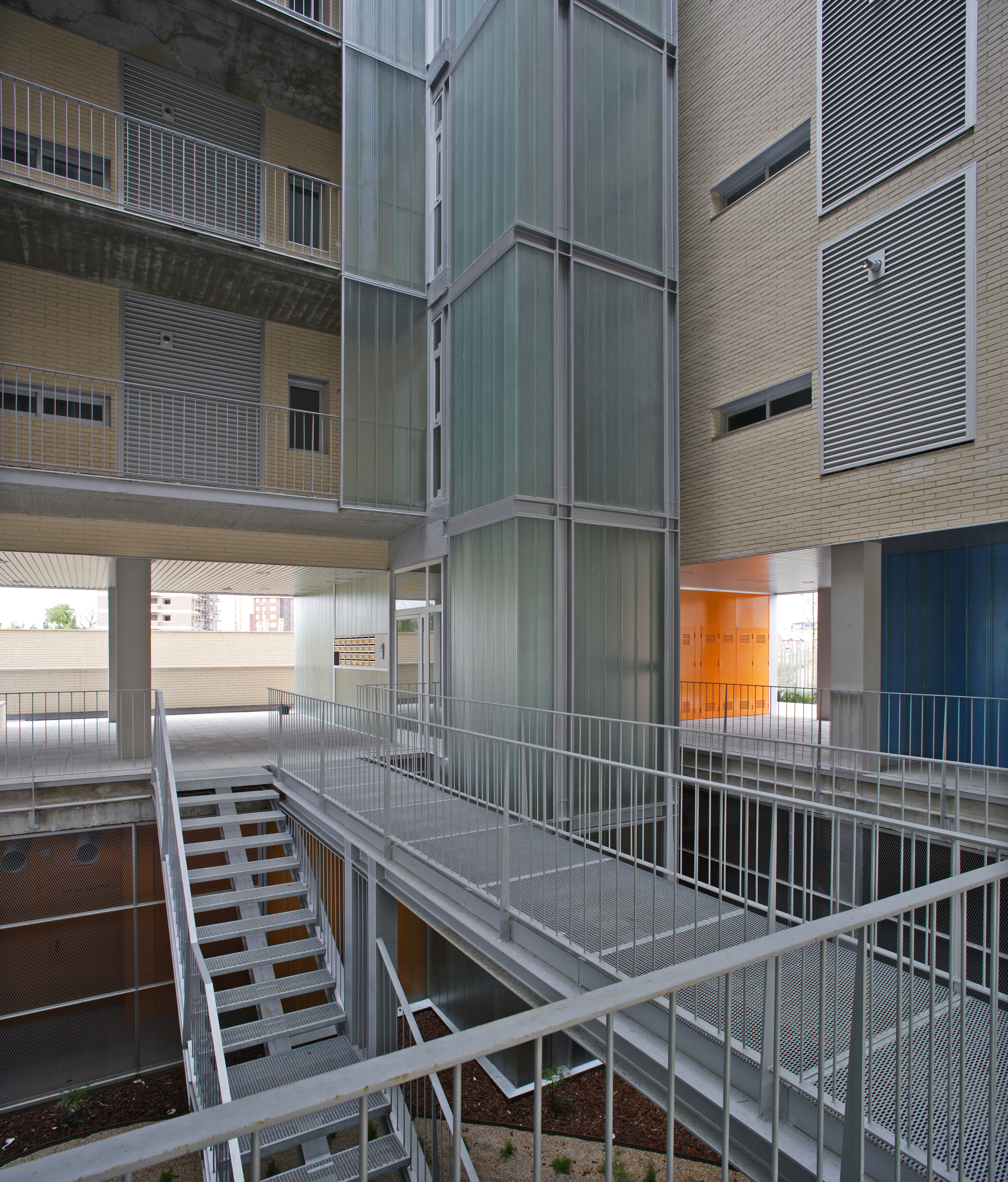
24 dwellings
Fuenlabrada, Spain

== Awards and honors ==
- 2015 – First Place in International Competition for City Hall and Cultural Center. Gumpoldskirchen, Austria.
- 2013 – COAM Award 2013 for Cuadernos de Vivienda, Poblado Dirigido de Orcasitas. Madrid, Spain.
- 2011 – COAM Award 2011 for Casa Las Hormigas. Madrid, Spain.
- 2010 – First Place in International Competition for Barrio Tiburtino III. Rome, Italy.
- 2010 – First Place for The National Commission of Energy. Madrid, Spain.
- 2008 – Veteco-Asefave Award for Best Window for 114 Dwellings in Fuenlabrada. Madrid, Spain.
- 2006 – Quality Award in Architecture and Housing from la Comunidad de Madrid 2005 for Casa de Chapa. Madrid, Spain.
- 2005 – Milka Bliznakov Prize 2005 for "Heroines of the Space". Virginia, USA
- 2005 – First place in restricted contest for Mercado de Chamartín awarded by MCH Association. Madrid, Spain.
- 2005 – COAM Award for Embajadores 52 Dwellings. Madrid, Spain.
- 2005 – Finalist for the FAD prize in Architecture and Interior Design for El Salón de Isabel II Park. Palencia, Spain.
- 2004 – First Prize in ATEG Galvanization for the Auditorium at the Salón de Isabel II Park. Palencia, Spain.
- 2003 – COAM Award 2003. Casa de Chapa. Madrid, Spain.
- 2002 – Award for Best Built Project in the Past Five Years for Viviendas Embajadores 52. Madrid, Spain.
- 2001 – First Prize for El Salón de Isabel II Park. Palencia, Spain.
- 2001 – COAM 2000 Diffusion of Architecture Award (Santiago Amón Award) for Banco de Bilbao. Madrid, Spain.
- 2001 – 15th Edition of the Means of Diffusion Awards from the Madrid City Council for the Banco de Bilbao. Madrid, Spain.
- 2000 – First Prize in the EMVS from the Madrid City Council for Embajadores 52 Dwellings. Madrid, Spain.
- 1999 – First Prize in the EMVS awarded by the Madrid City Council for 157 Dwellings. Villaverde, Spain.
- 1994 – COAM 93 Prize in Research for La villa urbana substantia de la ciudad mediterránea del siglo XXI. Madrid, Spain.

== Bibliography ==
=== Books ===
- Women Architects in the Modern Movement. Routledge Pub., New York, 2018. Preface by Kenneth Frampton. ISBN 978-1-138-73102-8.
- Vivienda Colectiva en España Siglo XX (1929–1992). Ed. TC Cuadernos, Valencia, 2013. ISBN 978-84-941172-6-8
- Eileen Gray: Objects and Furniture Design. Ed. Polígrafa, Barcelona, 2013. ISBN 978-84-343-1265-4
- Eileen Gray: Invitación al viaje. Documental dirigido por Jörg Bundschuh y Textos de Carmen Espegel, Colección Arquia, documental n.20. Fundación Caja de Arquitectos. Barcelona, 2011. Depósito Legal: B-25542-2011
- Aires Modernos. E.1027: Maison en bord de mer, Eileen Gray y Jean Badovici, 1926–1929. Mairea Libros, Madrid, 2010. ISBN 978-84-92641-26-0
- Cuadernos de Vivienda Colectiva CVI001: Edificio de viviendas en la calle de Muntaner, José Luis Sert, Barcelona 1929–31 = Residential building on Muntaner St.. Ed. GIVCO, Madrid, 2009. ISBN 978-84-922352-9-2
- Heroínas del espacio. Mujeres arquitectos en el Movimiento Moderno. Colección Textos Arquitectura y Diseño. Ed.Nobuko, Buenos Aires, Argentina, 2008. ISBN 978-84-934832-9-6. Primera edición: Colección Memorias Culturales. Ed. Generales de la Construcción, Valencia, 2006. ISBN 84-934444-8-0

=== Articles ===
- São Paulo Madrid. Habitaçâo e cidade contemporânea, pp. 82–85. Ed. Fapesp, Madrid, 2014.
- "Hacia la nueva sociedad comunista: La casa de transición del Narkomfin, epílogo de una investigación". PPA. Proyecto, Progreso, Arquitectura, n.9, pp. 26–49, 2013. ISSN 2171-6897, ISSN 2173-1616.
- "E.1027. Maison en bord de mer: Theoretical Restoration". Intervention Approaches in the 20th Century Architectural Heritage. Madrid, 2011, pp. 301–310. ISBN 978-84-8181-505-4.
- "Charlotte Perriand: el interior moderno en el estudio de la rue de Sèvres", Massilia 2008. Encuentro en Granada, París, 2009. ISBN 84-87478-71-9, pp. 132–145.
- "Biblioteca Pubblica e Parco di Lettura: Martín Lejárraga". The plan & Technologies in detail, n. 029, Bologna, Octubre 2008, pp. 96–108.ISSN 1720-6553.
- "To illuminate the walls: Atxu Amann-Andrés Cánovas-Nicolás Maruri". Oris, vol.IX, n.45, pp. 80–87, Zagreb, 2007.ISSN 1331-7571.
- "E.1027, Maison en bord de mer". Minerva, IV Época 02 2006, pp. 17–18.ISSN 1886-340X.
- "El Banco de Bilbao: ¿Invención o razón estructural?". Banco de Bilbao: Sáenz de Oíza. Ed. Departamento de Proyectos Arquitectónicos de la ETSA Madrid, 2000, pp. 41–95. OCLC 807430542
- "El nuevo espacio interior. La vanguardia del interiorismo español en los años treinta". Monografía Diseño del mueble en España 1902–1998, Experimenta Ediciones Diseño, Madrid, 1998, p. 15–32. ISSN 1133-9675.
- "El arte de vivir. Charlotte Perriand y el hábitat moderno". Arquitectura Viva, n.48, Madrid, 1996, pp. 60–63.ISSN 0214-1256.
- "Villa de Plinio (PFC)". El Croquis, n.24, Madrid, 1986, pp. 123–125.ISSN 0212-5633.

=== Other publications ===
- "New Civil Guard Barracks, Oropesa del Mar". Van Uffelen, Chris: Apartment Buildings, Braun Publishing AG, Berlín 2013, pp. 130–133. ISBN 978-3-03768-136-7.
- "A best practice of Urban Residence: Social Housing and its subsity system. Madrid: FOA, García-Germán Arquitectos, espegel-fisac arquitectos". Urban wisdom, advancing with China, n.43, 2010, pp. 40–45. ISSN 1009-7163.
- Spain Architects. Housing 5. "24 Viviendas. Edificio Avante. Zosma". Editor Manel Padura S.L., Barcelona, 2008, pp. 76–93. ISBN 978-84-935862-3-2.
- Spain Architects. Works 1. "Parque del Salón de Isabel II". Editor Manel Padura, Barcelona, 2007, pp. 146–164. ISBN 978-84-935-5957-1.
- Horizons, EMVS Madrid Social Housing, Vivienda Social en Madrid EMVS, 1981–2006. Catálogo Exposición Galería Aedes, Berlín, 2007, pp. 12. ISBN 978-3-937093-80-2.
- Vivienda y Sostenibilidad en España, Vol.1: unifamiliar, "Casa Lubillo-Fisac". Solanas, Toni. Ed. Gustavo Gili, Barcelona, 2007, pp. 108–113. ISBN 978-84-252-2104-0.
- "The fifth Milka Bliznakov Prize, 2015". International Archive on Women in Architecture, Virginia Polytechnic Institute and State University, Madrid, Fall 2006, n.18, p. 6–8.
- Habitar el Presente. Vivienda en España: sociedad, ciudad, tecnología y recursos. Ed. Ministerio de Vivienda, Madrid, 2006, pp. 122–125. ISBN 84-96387-23-2.
- "Parque de Isabel II, Palencia". a+t, Espacios colectivos in common II Collective spaces, 2005, n.26, pp. 68–78.ISSN 1132-6409.
- "Isabel II Park, Palencia – Spain". Hot Dip Galvanizing Today, n.25, South Africa, 2005, Volume 2, Issue 4, pp. 40–41.
- "Carmen Espegel Alonso. Vivienda colectiva – 23 Viviendas de Realojo en la Calle Embajadores nº 52 en Madrid". Vivienda Colectiva, Editorial Pencil, Valencia, 2005, pp. 170–185. ISBN 84-609-5252-5.
- Casas-Houses España-Spain, "Carmen Espegel Alonso: Casa Pajares-Bausá". Kliczkowski Publisher y Asppan S.L., Argentina, 2004, pp. 58–63. ISBN 978-84-89439-66-5.
- "23 Housing: Embajadores 52", MHM, Metropolitan Housing: Madrid. 15+5 Housing Projects: 15 Proyectos de vivienda E.M.V.. Editorial Rueda S.L., Madrid, 2003, pp. 68–79. ISBN 84-7207-138-3.
