= The Oval (Limassol) =

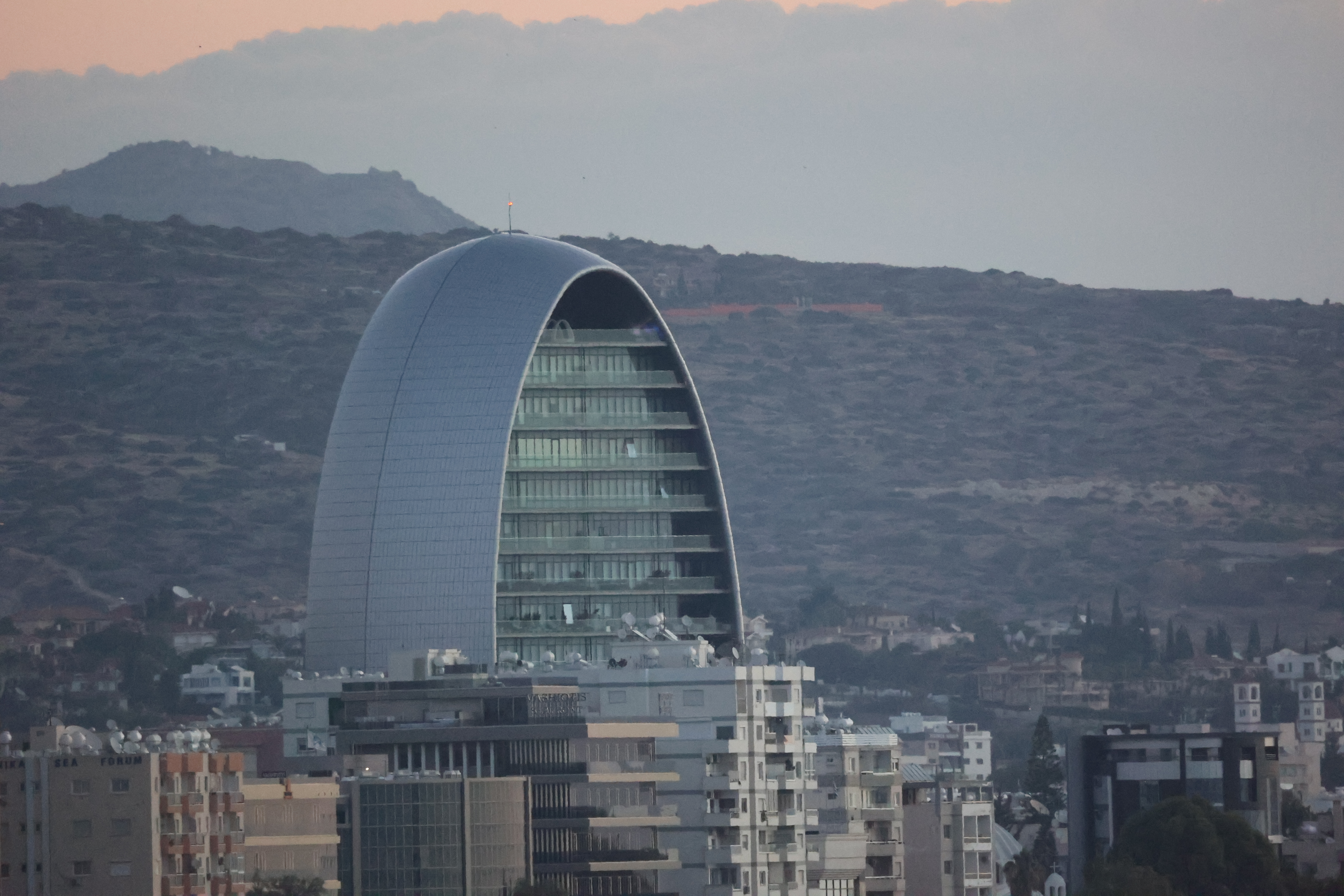
- The Oval seen from the Limassol Marina

- Location within Cyprus

General information
- Status: Completed
- Type: High-rise building
- Location: Limassol, Cyprus, Georgiou Griva Digeni
- Coordinates: 34.6899°N 33.0682°E
- Construction started: 2014
- Completed: 2017

Height
- Height: 75 metres (246 ft)

Technical details
- Floor count: 16
- Lifts/elevators: 3

Design and construction
- Architecture firm: Atkins, WWK, Armeftis Associates, Seamlexity
- Civil engineer: ASD Hyperstatic
- Main contractor: Cybarco

Other information
- Public transit access: EMEL 12 20 25 30

The Oval is a commercial high-rise building in Limassol, Cyprus. It was completed in February 2017 and opened in April 2017. With 16 stories, it is 75 metres (246 ft) tall and the tallest office building in Cyprus.

It was designed by Hakim Khennouchi, lead designer, whilst working at Atkins, he went on to complete the post concept design stages with WKK Architects. Armeftis Associates design offices acted as the local architect. The project was developed and constructed by Cybarco. Due to its complex geometrical shape, the project was put through an advanced computational framework, developed by SEAMLEXITY, which was purposely built to support multiple levels and disciplines of design, construction and digital fabrication. The Doubly Curved Shell is constructed of a Reinforced Concrete structure in combination with a steel frame and it is clad with around 10,000 different CNC fabricated aluminium panels in a highly automated, state of the art process, unique for the local fabrication standards.

== See also ==
- List of tallest buildings in Cyprus
- Tower 25
