= Tower 25 =

High-rise in Nicosia, Cyprus

Coordinates: 35.1686°N 33.3605°E

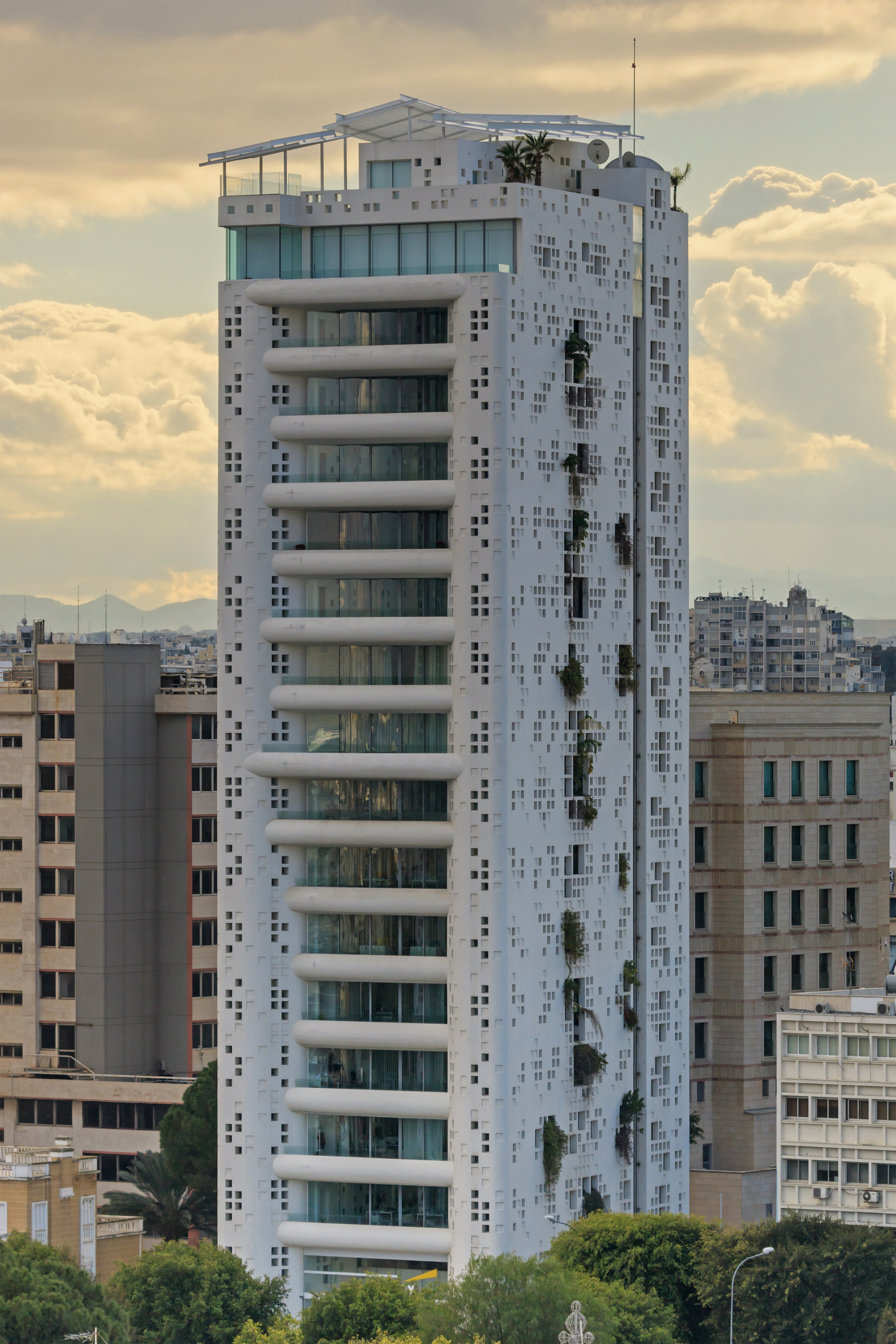
- A view from Shacolas Tower
- Interactive map of the Tower 25 area
- Alternative names: The White Walls

General information
- Status: Completed
- Location: Nicosia, Cyprus
- Completed: 2013
- Cost: €25 million
- Operator: Gerens Hill

Height
- Roof: 67 m (220 ft)

Technical details
- Floor count: 17 floors

Design and construction
- Architects: Jean Nouvel; Takis Sophocleous Architects
- Developer: Nice Day
- Main contractor: Lois Builders
- Awards: Best Tall Building Europe 2016 by CTBUH

Tower 25, also known as The White Walls, is a high-rise building located in central Nicosia, the capital of Cyprus. Designed by French architect Jean Nouvel, it gained recognition as one of Nicosia's notable landmarks due to its distinctive design and central location. Standing at a height of 62 meters, Tower 25 ranks as the eleventh-tallest building in Cyprus.

The ground floor, the mezzanine areas, and the first six floors above them are occupied by offices belonging to Ernst & Young (EY). The subsequent seven floors consist of apartments that offer panoramic views of the entire capital city. The penthouse, spanning the two top floors, showcases a design inspired by traditional Cypriot architecture and features a swimming pool.

A significant portion of the apartments, including the penthouse, had already been sold prior to the commencement of construction. The total cost of the building was approximately €25 million, and its construction was completed in early 2013.

== Architecture ==
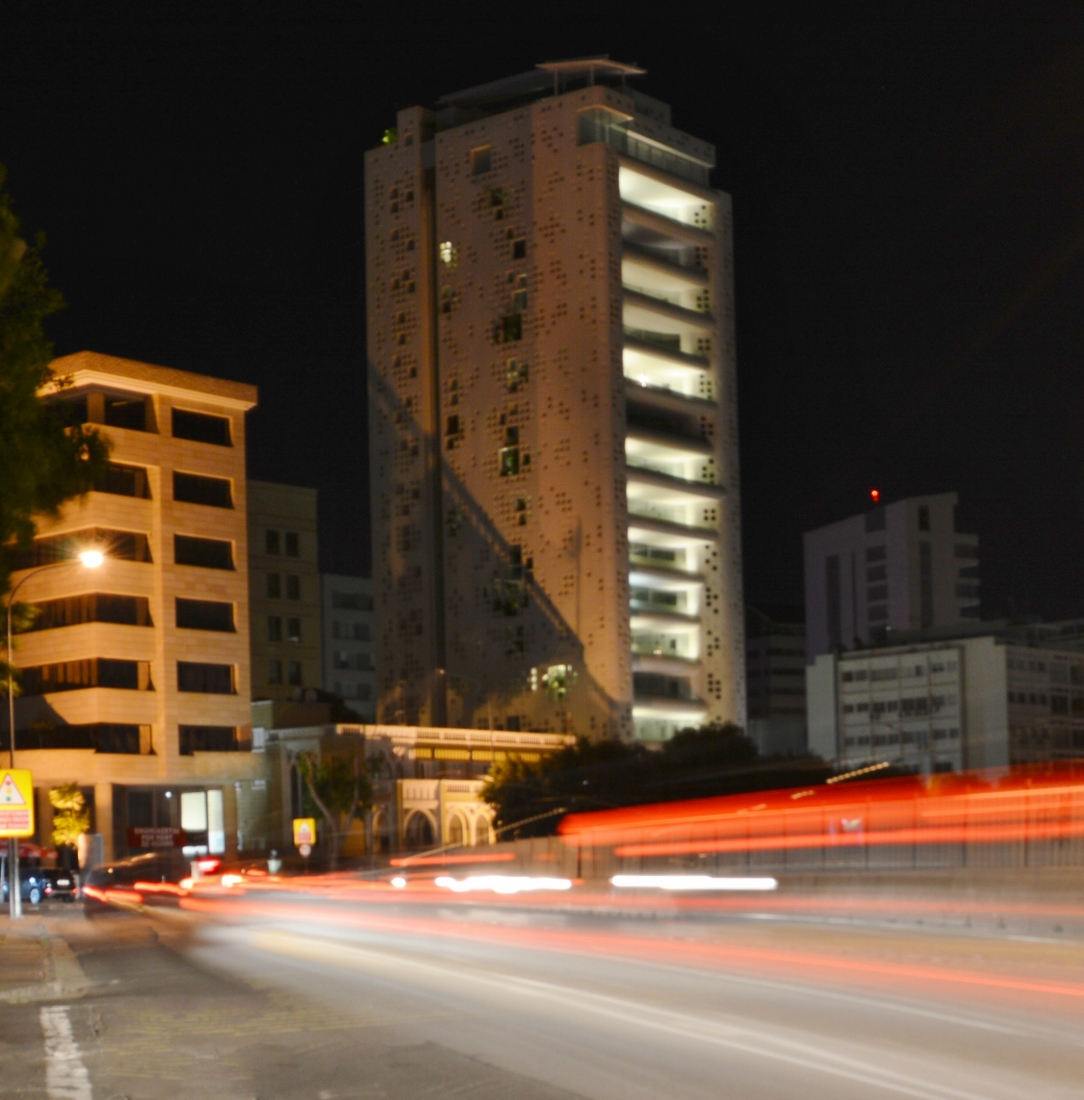
Tower 25 by night from Stasinou avenue.

Each floor of the building has a full-length balcony. They vary in width and depth; each offers views of the city and its walls.

The other façades of the building exhibit a pattern of square voids that serve as both windows and openings for natural ventilation, catering to the hot climate of the city. Particularly on the sun-facing southern façade, a series of balconies extend across the entire width of the building, effectively addressing the need for shade and facilitating a pleasant outdoor experience.

== Location ==
The building overlooks the Venetian fortifications of the city of Nicosa. Adjacent to the newly redesigned Eleftheria Square, envisioned by architect Zaha Hadid, it benefits from its proximity to the city's major commercial thoroughfares, namely Makariou Avenue and Themistokli Dervi Avenue. The strategic positioning of the building is intended to stimulate further development along the ring avenue encircling the city walls.

== See also ==
- Bosco Verticale
