= Terje Moe (architect) =

Norwegian architect (1933–2009)

Terje Moe (4 November 1933 – 24 July 2009) was a Norwegian architect.

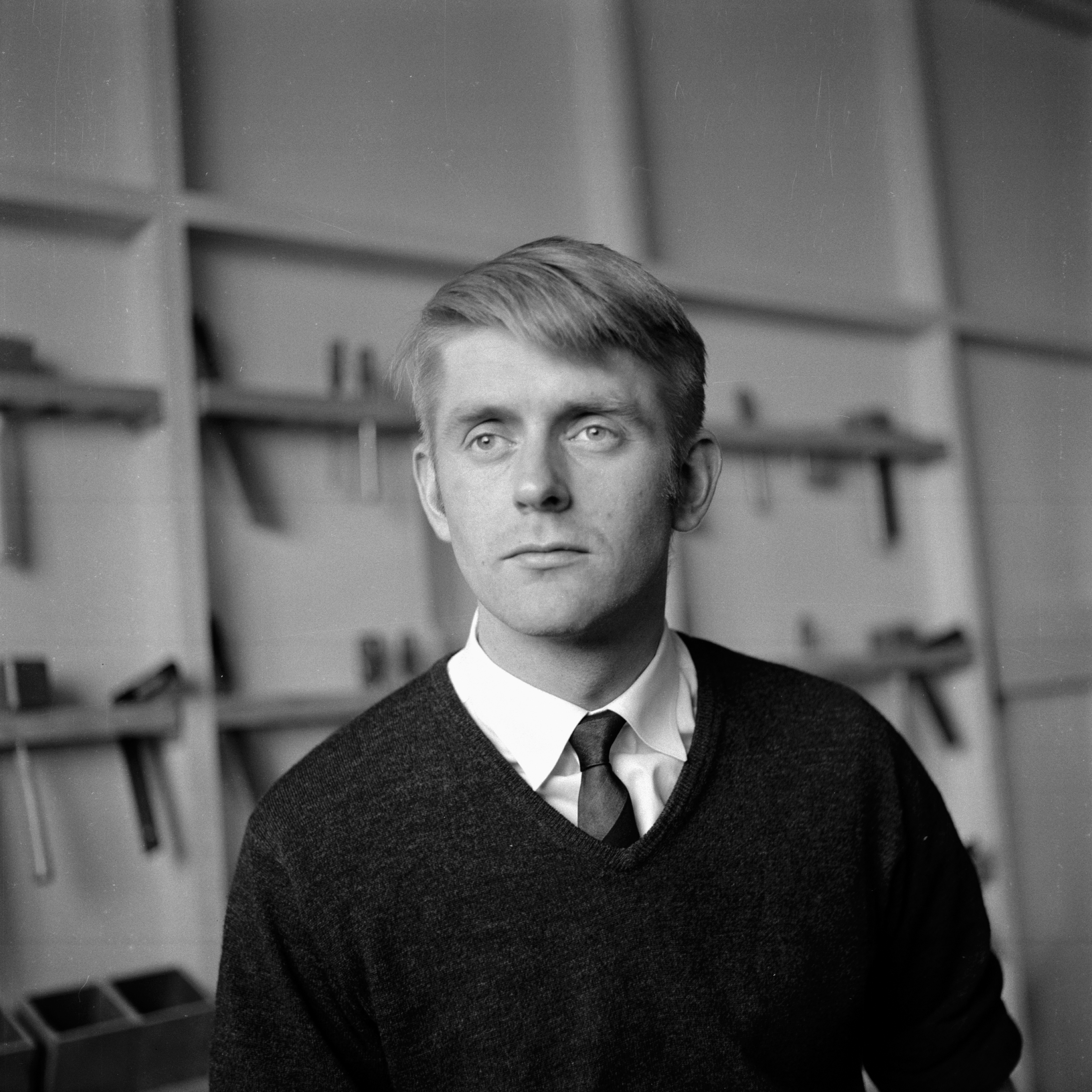
The Norwegian Architect Terje Moe

He was born in Oslo. He graduated from the Norwegian Institute of Technology in 1959, and worked as a teacher there from 1959 to 1966. He then worked at the Oslo School of Architecture and Design from 1966 to 1970, ran his own architect's office from 1970 to 1976 before returning to the School of Architecture and Design as an associate professor in 1976. In 1987 he became a professor at the Norwegian Institute of Technology, and he left the School of Architecture and Design. He died in July 2009.
