= Amann Cánovas Maruri =

Amann Cánovas Maruri is a Spanish architecture firm established in Madrid in 1998. Its three eponymous co-founding partners are Atxu Amann Alcocer, Andrés Cánovas Alcaraz, and Nicolás Maruri Mendoza.

The concern is perhaps most well known for its design of the pavilion of Spain at Expo 2020 in Dubai, U.A.E. The pavilion employs a series of very distinctly hued conical volumes which facilitate greater air circulation for temperature moderation. The structure also features a series of domes which created using recyclable materials like wood, iron, and fabric, in addition to referencing traditional insulation techniques in combination with innovative solutions. The pavilion is situated in the "Sustainability" section of the Expo.

Their work is the subject of the volume "TA 18- Collective Housing - Amann- Canovas- Maruri". They also been written about by Carmen Espegel.

Among their other noted projects are a very colorfully clad housing building in Carabanchel district of Madrid (2009) and the Monteagudo Museum (2010) in Monteagudo, Navarre, Spain.

== Notes ==
- Carmen Espegel, "To illuminate the walls: Atxu Amann-Andrés Cánovas-Nicolás Maruri". Oris, vol.IX, n.45, pp. 80–87, Zagreb, 2007.ISSN 1331-7571.
