= Émile-José Fettweis =

Belgian architect (1927–2021)

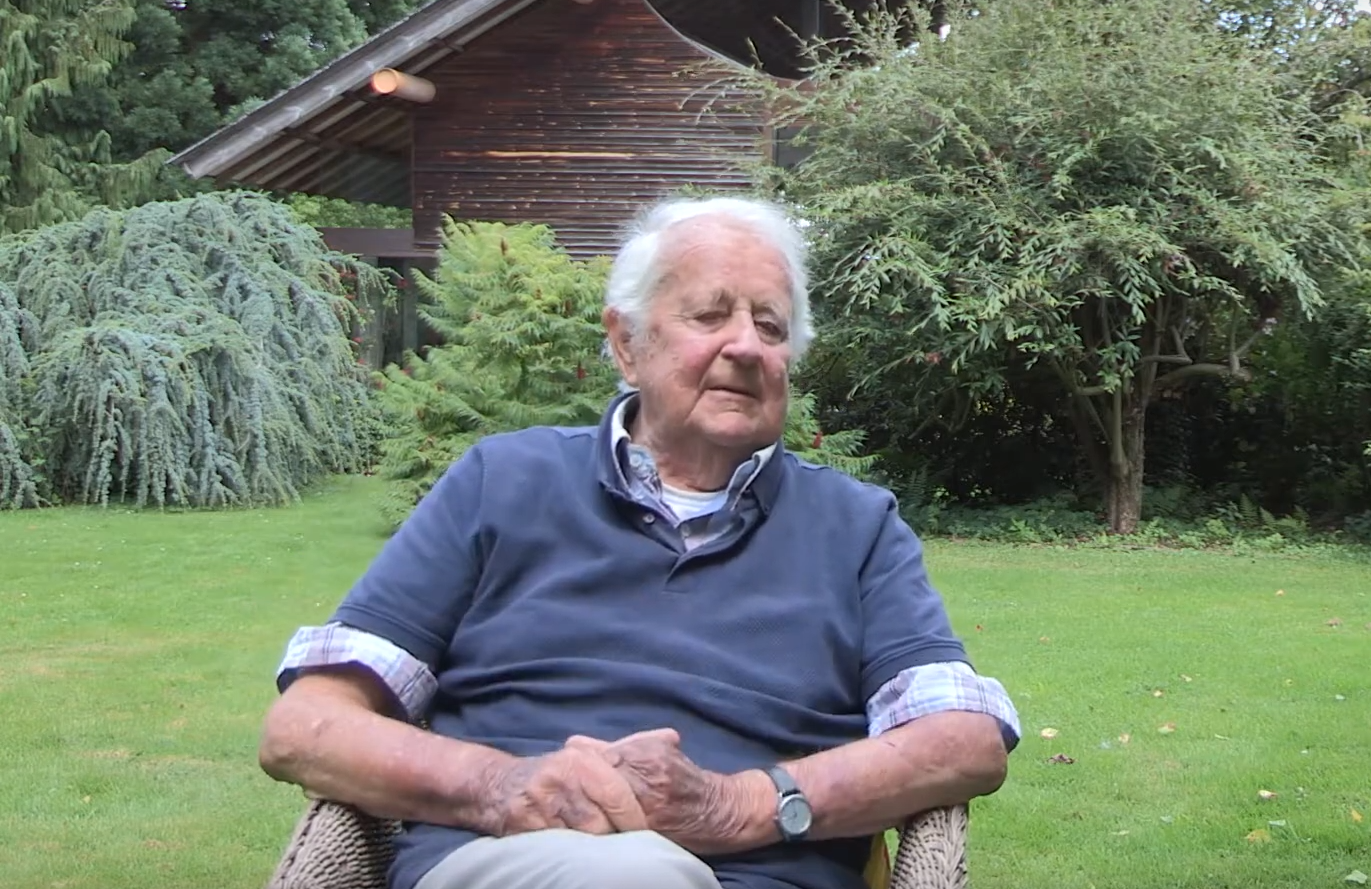
- Born: 4 July 1927; Verviers, Belgium
- Died: 29 June 2021 (aged 93); Verviers, Belgium
- Occupations: Architect; Urbanist

Émile-José Fettweis (4 July 1927 – 29 June 2021) was a Belgian architect, urbanist, and researcher.

== Biography ==
Fettweis was born in Verviers to a textile worker. He obtained his architectural diploma in 1952 in Liège. He then taught at the Institut Saint-Luc, from where he had just graduated, and taught there for 43 years. Other than his teaching career, he worked as an architect and held an independent practice in Verviers from 1964 to 1987. He then founded a private company, BVBA Atelier E.J. Fettweis and Partners. Throughout his life, he remained humble with no desire to gain attention from the general public. However, he was vocal in his opposition to the construction of a motorway through Verviers in the late 20th Century.

Émile-José Fettweis died in Verviers on 29 June 2021 at the age of 93.

== Architectural work ==
- Maison Gillissen (Beyne-Heusay, 1954)
- Maison Lecat (Verviers, 1967)
- Chapelle Sainte Catherine de Sienne (Astenet, 1968)
- Bâtiment de Chimie et Physique appliquées – Louvain-la-Neuve (1974)
- Maison communautaire Sainte Catherine de Sienne (Astenet, 1980)
- Siège de la Société Générale de Banque (Beyne-Heusay, 1982)

== Awards ==
- Prix Debouny (1952)
- Prix Van de Ven (1956)
- Prix du Bois de la Province de Liège (1958)
- Premier lauréat au concours organisé pour la Maison de la Culture d'Eupen (1966)
- Officer of the Order of the Crown
