= One Limassol =

Tallest building in Cyprus

- One Limassol's official logo

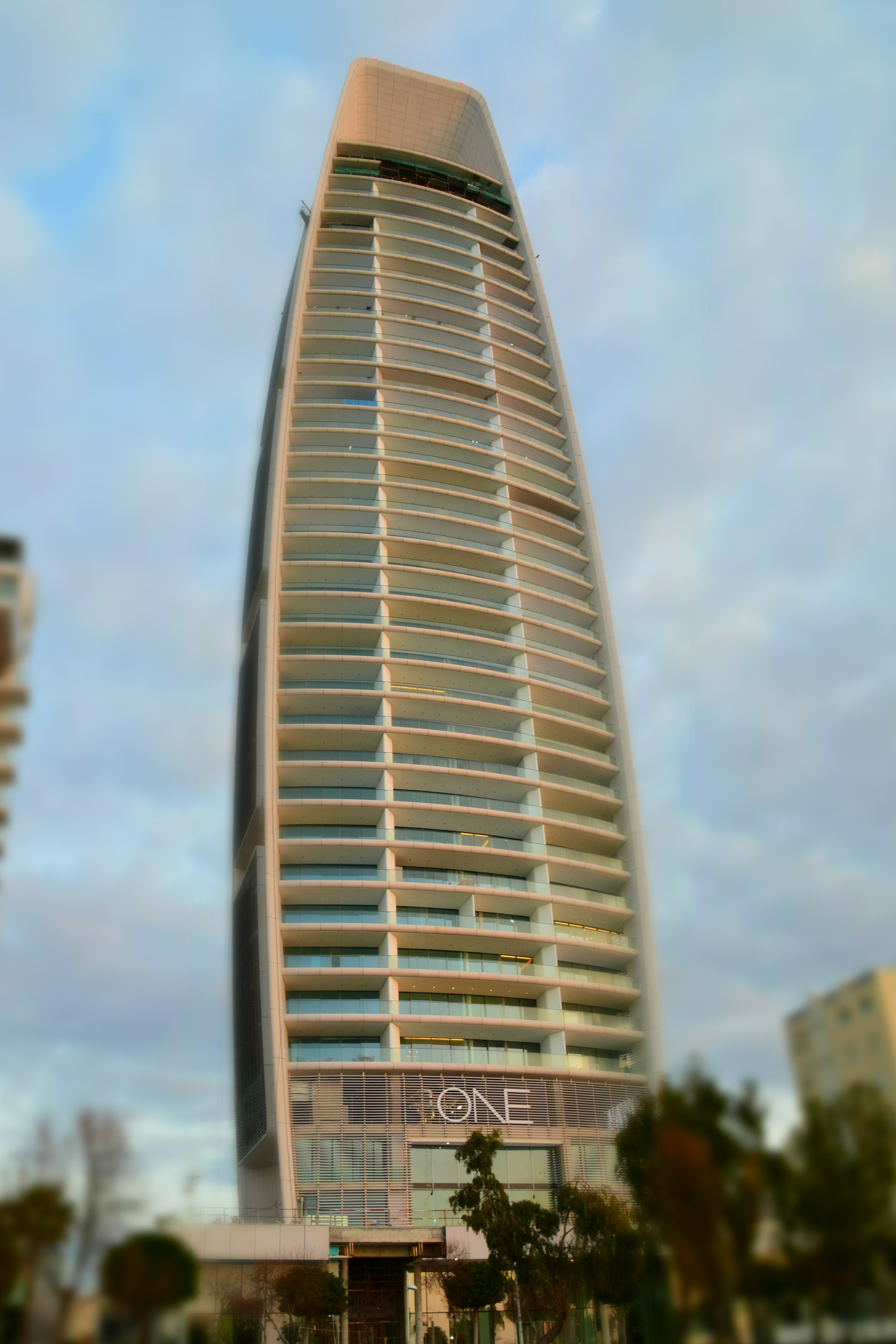
- Interactive map of the One Limassol area

General information
- Status: Completed
- Type: Residential
- Location: Mediterranean Court, 28th October, Limassol, Cyprus, Cyprus
- Coordinates: 34°41′13″N 33°3′53″E
- Construction started: November 2017
- Completed: 2021
- Opening: 2022

Height
- Top floor: 170 m (560 ft)

Technical details
- Floor count: 38 (+3 underground)

Design and construction
- Architect: Hakim Khennouchi (Atkins)
- Developer: Pafilia

Website
- Official website

One Limassol, better known simply as ONE is a residential skyscraper in Limassol, Cyprus. Built between 2017 and 2021, the tower stands at 170 m (560 ft) tall with 38 floors and is the joint-tallest building in Cyprus alongside the Trilogy Limassol Seafront West Tower.

== History ==
The construction of the project was planned to start in early 2016, However, it was pushed back to November 2017 due to planning delays. It has a total of 38 floors and it rises to a height of 170 meters (558 ft.), making it the tallest building in Cyprus.

One Tower was designed by architect Hakim Khennouchi (WKK Architects) and Eraclis Papachristou Architects (Architects of record). Structural design was completed by Buro Happold Engineering and PPA.

== Architecture ==
Due to the complex concave shape which is variable throughout its height, geometry and computational consultants Seamlexity were utilised to optimise and segregate the skin to doubly curved GRC panels.

The building features a restaurant and a residential lobby by its lower levels and a total of 84 luxury apartment units sorted three per floor. The penthouse apartments occupy three floors and are equipped with a swimming pool, conference rooms and tertiary spaces.

The tower's height necessitated that the facade construction included sufficient passive fire protection, adhering to local regulations and guaranteeing lasting safety during the building's lifespan. Following years of experience with Siderise products and its Cypriot distributor, DPS, façade contractors Glassline selected a mix of Siderise products. The RH Horizontal Cavity Barriers are intended to enable the facade system to sustain airflow and expel moisture from its structure; however, in case of a fire, they quickly shut the ventilation opening to form a functioning seal against hot smoke and flames.

The obstacles are enhanced with OSCI Cassette Inserts that have a Class A2 rating. All these items have been subjected to thorough third-party evaluations to guarantee reliable performance. Along with offering basic passive fire protection, the stonewall Lamella core of the RV Vertical Cavity Barriers enables them to adapt to the natural movement linked to rainscreen facades. This is particularly crucial for this project on the exposed seafront. This is why the cavity barrier brackets were chosen to be made of sturdy galvanized steel, safeguarding them from corrosion due to the sea air quality.

== Awards ==
One Limassol’s Awards
| Year | Award | Ref |
|---|---|---|
| 2015 | Gold Award for Best Project in Cyprus, from Homes Overseas Russian Awards | |
| 2015 | Gold Award for Best High Rising Project in Cyprus, from Homes Overseas Russian Awards | |
| 2016 | Gold Award for Best Project in Cyprus, from Homes Overseas Russian Awards | |
| 2016 | Gold Award for Best High Rising Project in Cyprus, from Homes Overseas Russian Awards | |
| 2016 | Best Residential High-rise Development in Cyprus, Five Star, from European Property Awards | |
| 2016 | Best Residential High-rise Development in Europe, from International Property Awards | |
| 2017 | Best Residential High-rise Development in Cyprus, Five Star, from European Property Awards | |
| 2017 | Best Residential High-rise Development in Europe, from International Property Awards | |
| 2018 | Best Residential High-rise Development Cyprus, from European Property Awards | |
| 2019 | Best Residential High-rise Development Cyprus, from European Property Awards | |

== See also ==
- List of tallest buildings in Cyprus
- List of tallest buildings in Europe
- Limassol
