= Shacolas Tower =

Building in Cyprus

Coordinates: 35.1719°N 33.3615°E

Shacolas Tower or Ledras Tower
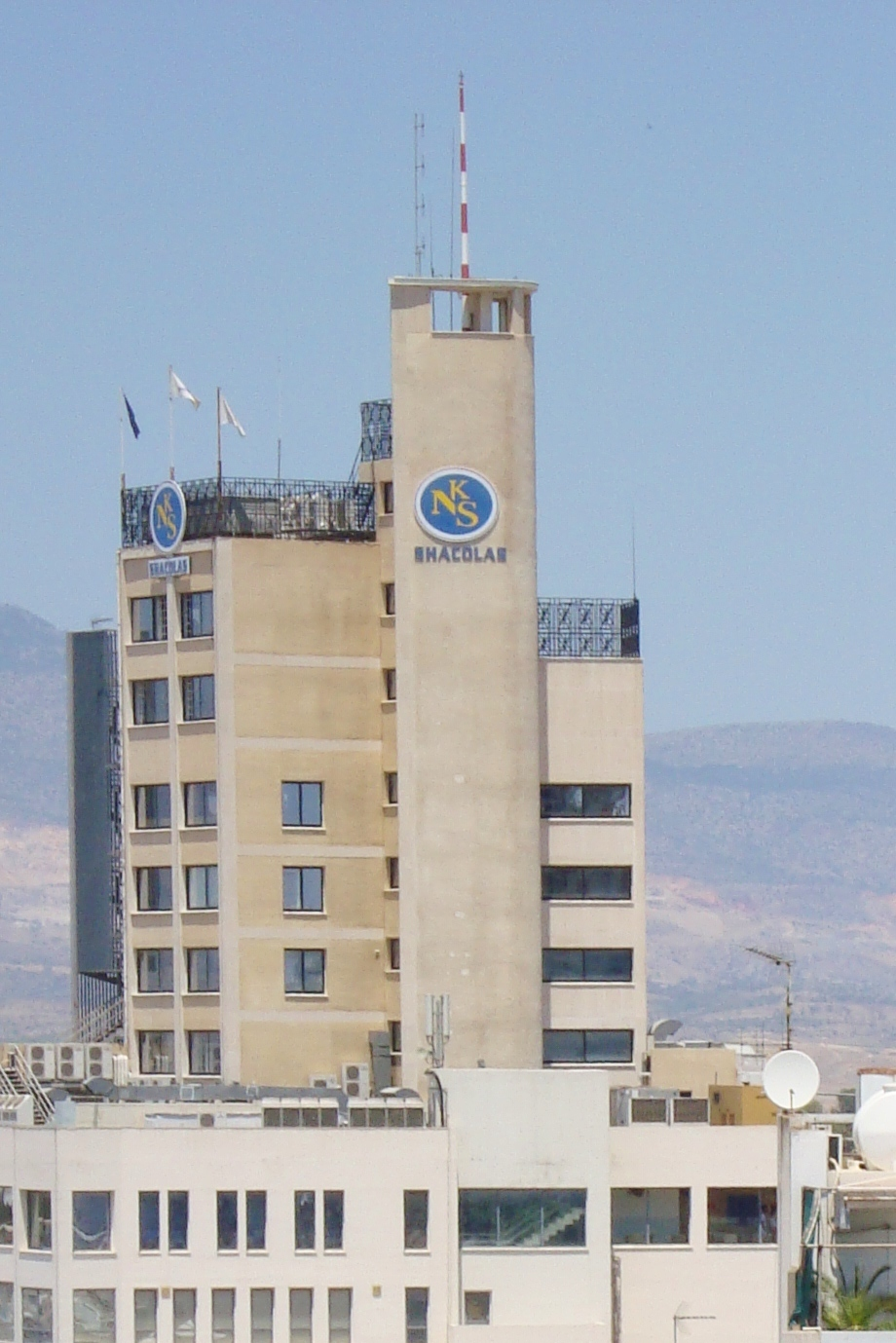
- Shacolas Tower in the background
- Interactive map of the Shacolas Tower or Ledras Tower area

General information
- Status: Completed
- Type: Office; Observatory; Museum; Business Center; Conference hall
- Location: Nicosia, Cyprus
- Completed: 1959
- Owner: CYREIT AIF Variable Capital Investment Company PLC
- Operator: CYREIT AIF Variable Capital Investment Company PLC

Height
- Roof: 50 meters

Technical details
- Floor count: 11 floors
- Floor area: 7.300 square
- Lifts/elevators: 11 floors

Design and construction
- Architect: Raglan Squire
- Developer: Costas Manglis

The Shacolas Tower or Ledras Tower (Greek: Πύργος Σιακόλα) is a highrise building in Nicosia, Cyprus. It was completed in 1959. It was built by Costas Manglis and was formerly known as the Manglis Tower, which housed the offices of the General Engineering and Hellenic Mining Company. It is located in the old town of Nicosia and it was the tallest building in Cyprus until 1978. The first 5 floors are H&M department stores and the 6th floor used to be a cafeteria offering a panoramic view of the old city. The 11th floor is an observatory and museum overlooking the whole capital. There are telescopes, binoculars and a recorded feature on the history of the capital.

== Museum and observatory ==
The Ledra Observatory Museum functions as an integrated cultural institution and observation facility located on the 11th floor of the Shacolas Tower. Developed through a partnership between the Leventis Municipal Museum of Nicosia and the Debenhams Group, the observatory provides a panoramic perspective of the city's urban topography. The exhibition documents the historical evolution of Old Nicosia through a collection of archival photography and topographical descriptions. The facility is equipped with optical instruments for site-specific observation and a multilingual audiovisual narrative detailing the city's chronological development
