= List of tallest buildings in Cyprus =

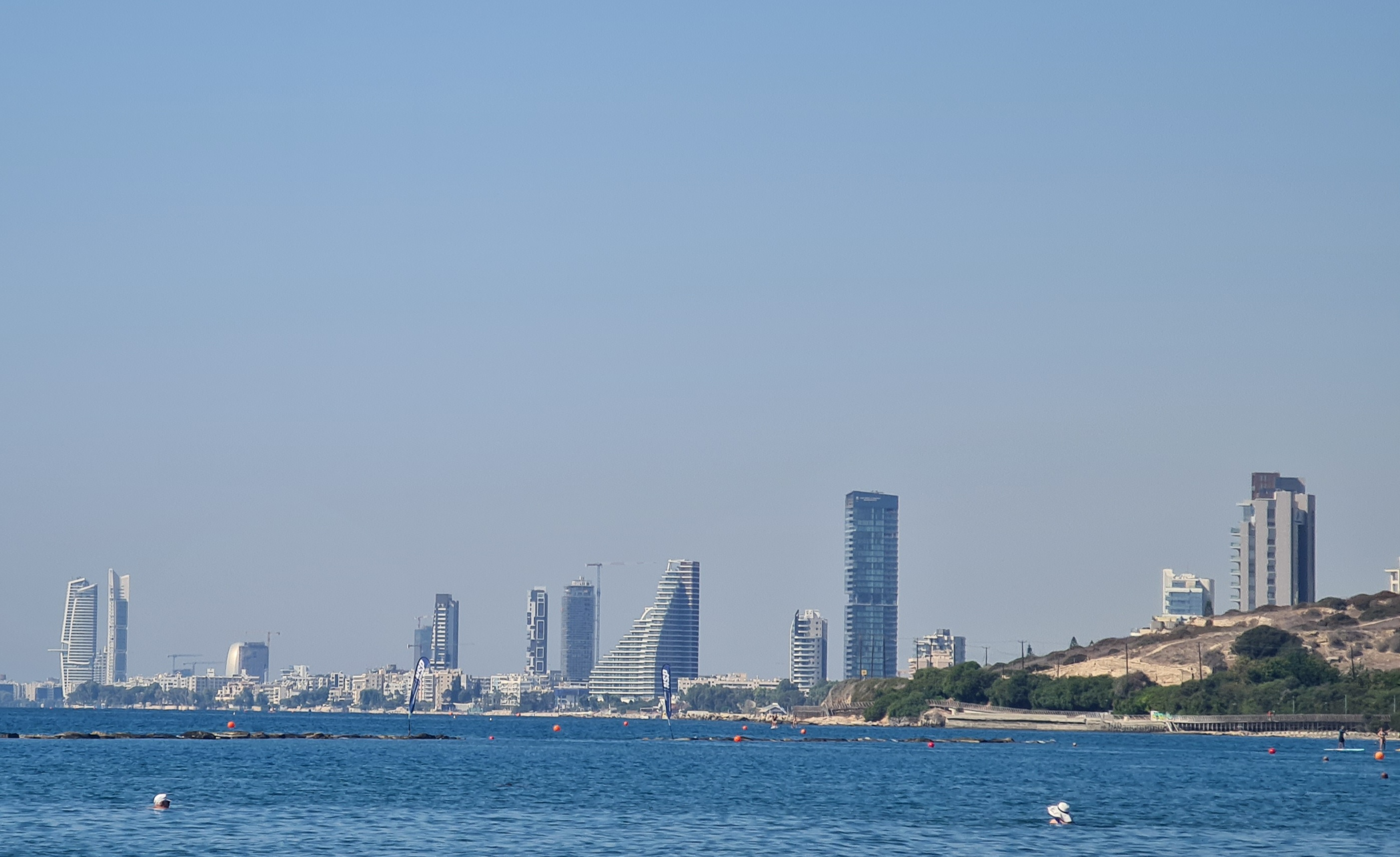
The skyline of Limassol, Cyprus in 2024.

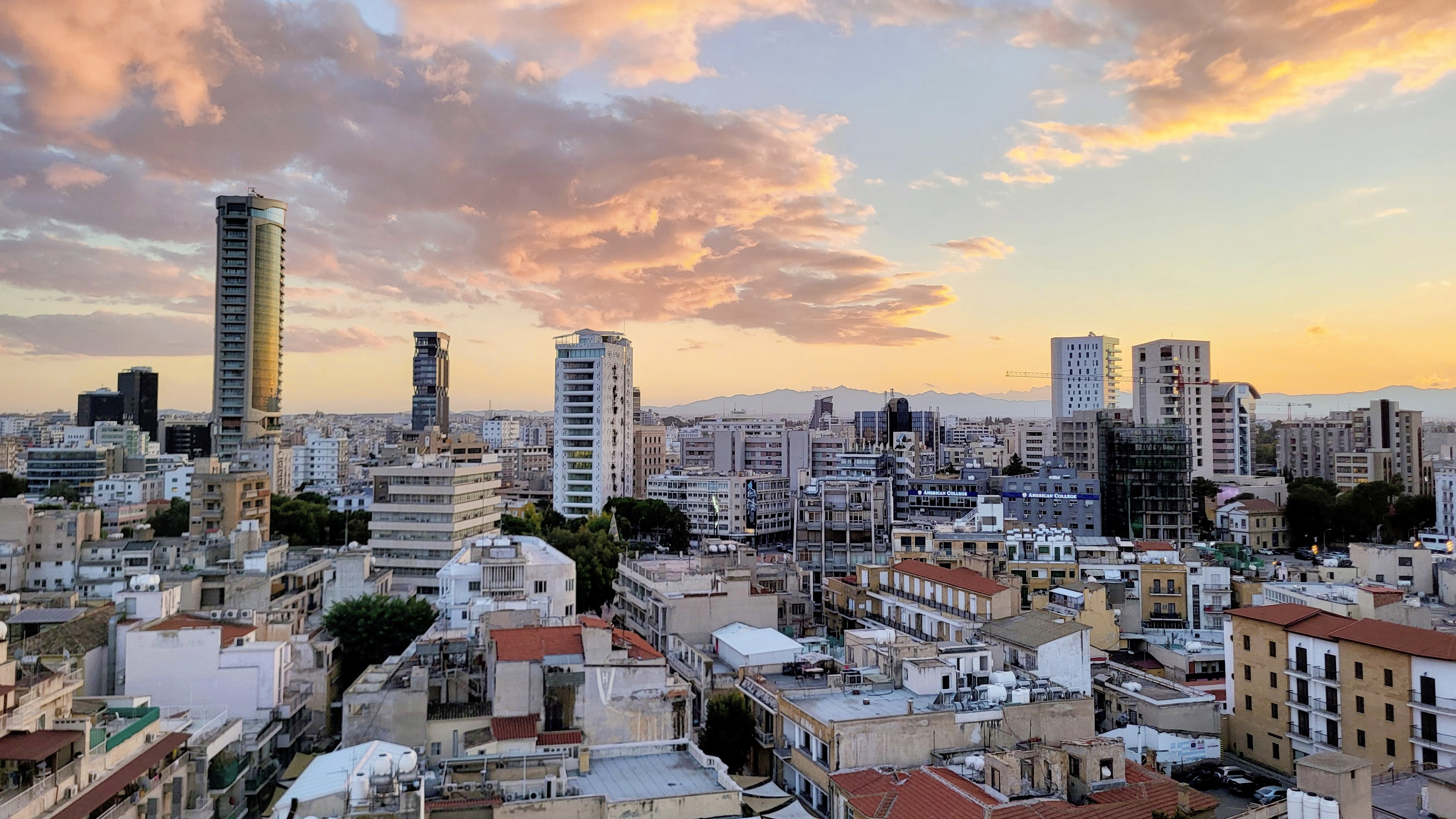
The skyline of Nicosia, Cyprus in 2024, as seen from Shacolas Tower.

As of 2023, Cyprus is going through a major construction phase that first began in late 2013 when legislation passed encouraging construction. Since then, hundreds of new housing units and mushrooming businesses have been, and are still being, introduced to Cyprus each year, mainly in the city of Limassol. The construction industry in Cyprus accounts for 7% of the country's GDP.

Currently, there are about 60 buildings that are proposed and/or under construction that will stand taller than 50m upon completion, out of which about the half of them are skyscrapers. The One high-rise residential building is the tallest tower in Cyprus, the tallest seafront residential building in Europe and amongst the 100 tallest buildings in the European Union. Amongst the recently completed projects is the City of Dreams Mediterranean which is the European Union's largest casino resort.

== Tallest buildings in Cyprus ==
The following lists rank all skyscrapers and high-rise buildings in Cyprus standing at least 100 metres (328 ft) and at least 50 metres (164 ft) tall, respectively.

=== Skyscrapers (≥100 meters) ===
Was the tallest building in Cyprus upon completion

Rank	Name	Image	City	Height		Floors	Year built	Use	Notes
1	One		Limassol	170m	558 ft	37	2022	Residential	The joint-tallest building in Cyprus along with Trilogy West Tower, as well as the tallest seafront residential building in Europe, and the 48th tallest building in the European Union. Designed by Hakim Khennouchi (WWK Architects).
2	Trilogy; West Tower (1/3)		Limassol	170m	558 ft	39	2024	Residential	The joint-tallest building in Cyprus along with One. Designed by Hakim Khennouchi (WWK Architects).
3	Trilogy; East Tower (2/3)		Limassol	160m	525 ft	35	2024	Mixed Use	The second tallest building in Cyprus.
4	Ritz-Carlton Residences		Limassol	138m	453 ft	34	2023	Residential	Designed by Moshe Tzur Architects & Town Planners.
5	360 Nicosia		Nicosia	135m	443 ft	34	2020	Residential	The tallest building in Nicosia, and the tallest building in Cyprus outside of Limassol. Designed by Maria Gerarhaki.
6	Neocleous Tower	Neocleous Tower Limassol	Limassol	120m	394 ft	26	2025	Commercial / Office	Completed in December 2025 and reached full occupancy.
7	Dream Tower		Limassol	119m	390,5 ft	27	2023	Residential	
8	Ayia Napa Marina East Tower (1/2)		Ayia Napa	114m	374 ft	27	2023	Residential	
9	Limassol Del Mar East Tower (1/2)		Limassol	107m	351 ft	27	2022	Residential	Designed by Benoy Architects.
10	Sky Tower		Limassol	103m	338 ft	24	2021	Residential	Designed by UHA London.
11	Only Tower		Limassol	102m	334 ft	24	2020	Residential	It is also known as the i100 Residences.
12	The Icon		Limassol	100m	328 ft	21	2021	Residential	Designed by UDS Architects + Designers.

=== High-Rise Buildings (50-100 meters) ===
Was the tallest building in Cyprus upon completion

Rank	Name	Location	Height		Floors	Year built	Use	Notes
1	Labs Tower	Nicosia	95m	312 ft	22	2022	Mixed Use	The second tallest building in Nicosia. Designed by Cypriot architect Heracles Papachristou and belonging to Israeli billionaire Teddy Sagi.
2	Ararat Grand Residences	Limassol	94m	308 ft	24	2023	Residential	
3	The Asteroid	Nicosia	80m	262.5 ft	16	2022	Commercial	The tallest solely commercial/office building in Cyprus.
4	Central Park Residence	Nicosia	78m	256 ft	21	2018	Residential	The tallest building in Cyprus from 2018 to 2020.
5=	Olympic Residences Tower A (1/2)	Limassol	76m	249 ft	20	2012	Residential	The tallest buildings in Cyprus from 2012 to 2018 and the tallest buildings in Limassol from 2012 to 2020. The tallest building in Limassol from 1997 to 2012, was the mid-rise 10-story Nicolaou Pentadromos Center building.
5=	Olympic Residences Tower B (2/2)	Limassol	76m	249 ft	20	2012	Residential	The tallest buildings in Cyprus from 2012 to 2018 and the tallest buildings in Limassol from 2012 to 2020. The tallest building in Limassol from 1997 to 2012, was the mid-rise 10-story Nicolaou Pentadromos Center building.
7=	City of Dreams Mediterranean	Limassol	75m	246 ft	16	2022	Casino / Hotel	Cyprus' first integrated casino resort, the only one of its kind in the European Union.
7=	The Oval	Limassol	75m	246 ft	17	2017	Commercial	The tallest commercial/office building in Limassol. Designed by Hakim Khennouchi (WWK Architects).
7=	Wargaming HQ	Nicosia	75m	246 ft	15	2014	Commercial	Also known as president building. The tallest commercial/office building in Nicosia from 2014 to 2021.
10	Limassol Del Mar West Tower (2/2)	Limassol	68m	223 ft	18	2022	Residential	Designed by Benoy Architects.
11	White Walls	Nicosia	67m	220 ft	18	2013	Residential	Also known as Tower 25. Designed by French architect Jean Nouvel.
12=	The Arc-Ship	Limassol	66.5m	218 ft	17	2018	Residential	
12=	Soho Resort (2/2)	Paphos	66.5m	218 ft	15	2023	Residential	
14=	Metropolitan	Nicosia	66m	217 ft	19	2021	Government	
14=	Cyprus Trade Bank	Nicosia	66m	217 ft	16	1996	Commercial	The tallest building in Cyprus from 1996 to 2012.
16	Leventis Art Gallery	Nicosia	61.4m	201 ft	15	2014	Gallery/ Residential	
17=	Nice Dream	Nicosia	60m	197 ft	15	2022	Mixed Use	
17=	Portgate Tower	Limassol	60m	197 ft	15	2022	Commercial	
19=	Radisson Blu	Larnaca	59m	194 ft	16	2018	Hotel	The tallest building in Larnaca since 2018, and the tallest hotel in Cyprus.
19=	Eurobank HQ	Nicosia	59m	194 ft	15	2019	Commercial	
21	180° Limassol	Limassol	57m	187 ft	14	2022	Residential	
22	iHome Block A	Limassol	56m	184 ft	11	2018	Residential	
23=	Novel Tower	Larnaca	55m	180 ft	14	2010	Mixed Use	The tallest building in Larnaca from 2010 to 2018.
23=	Amathus Residences	Limassol	55m	180 ft	13	2023	Residential	Designed by Hakim Khennouchi (WWK Architects)
25	Cedars Oasis	Limassol	54m	177 ft	16	2019	Mixed Use	
26=	The Tower	Limassol	53m	173 ft	14	2020	Residential	A residential highrise building within St. Raphael Resort and Marina grounds.
26=	Mediterranean Residences	Limassol	53m	173 ft	14	2020	Residential	A residential highrise building within Mediterranean Beach Hotel grounds.
26=	Athanasiou Tower	Limassol	53m	173 ft	14	2021	Residential	
29=	Habitat	Larnaca	52m	170,6 ft	13	2023	Under Construction	
29=	Irida 3	Larnaca	52m	171 ft	14	2012	Government/ Commercial	
29=	KEMA	Nicosia	52m	171 ft	12	1978	Commercial	The tallest building in Cyprus from 1978 to 1996.
32	Shacolas Tower	Nicosia	50m	164 ft	11	1959	Observatory/ Commercial	The tallest building in Cyprus from 1959 to 1978.

== Tallest building history ==
Years	Building	City	Height	
2022-	One	Limassol	170m	558 ft
2020-2022	360 Nicosia	Nicosia	135m	443 ft
2018-2020	Central Park Residence	Nicosia	78m	256 ft
2012-2018	Olympic Residences	Limassol	76m	249 ft
1996-2012	Cyprus Trade Bank	Nicosia	66m	217 ft
1978-1996	KEMA	Nicosia	52m	171 ft
1959-1978	Shacolas Tower	Nicosia	50m	164 ft

== Tallest building by usage ==
The list below denotes the tallest buildings by their usage. Buildings with multiple usages aren't listed.

Type	Building	City	Height		Year
Residential	One	Limassol	170m	558 ft	2022
Commercial	Neocleous Tower	Limassol	120m	394 ft	2025
Hotel	City of Dreams Mediterranean	Limassol	75m	246 ft	2022

== Tallest building by city ==
The list below denotes the tallest building per city.

City	Building	Height		Year	Use
Limassol	One	170m	558 ft	2022	Residential
Nicosia	360 Nicosia	135m	443 ft	2020	Residential
Ayia Napa	Ayia Napa Marina East Tower (1/2)	115m	377 ft	2022	Residential
Paphos	Soho Resort (2/2)	66.5m	218 ft	2023	Residential
Larnaca	Raddison Blu	59m	194 ft	2018	Hotel

== Buildings under construction ==
This list denotes buildings that are under construction or that have been proposed in Cyprus, and are planned to rise at least 50 metres.

Status:
Under Construction	On Hold	Approved	Proposed

Rank	Building	City	Height		Floors	Year	Status	Use	Updates
1	Aura	Limassol	181.5m	595,5 ft	44	TBA	Approved	Residential	To be erected at a plot where a shopping mall currently stands / No works have begun as of yet
2	Limassol NEO Riva (1/4)	Limassol	173m	568 ft	43	TBA	On Hold	Residential	Oct '21: Foundation works.
3	Areti	Limassol	150m	492 ft	37	TBA	Proposed	Residential	Considered to be a stale proposal.
4	Radisson Blu Capital	Nicosia	148,5m	487 ft	36	TBA	Proposed	Hotel / Residential	Considered to be a stale proposal.
5	The Limassol Wharf Project Tower A	Limassol	143m	469 ft	35	TBA	Approved	Residential	Investors from China have acquired the 'LOEL' plot, in the Karnagio area and are planning the construction of three high-rise residential towers / No works have begun as of yet.
6	Limassol Blu Marine Poseidon (1/2)	Limassol	132m	433 ft	33	2024	Under Construction	Mixed Use	May '24: The concrete core is completed up to the 30th floor and the floor slabs up to the 26th.
7	Limassol NEO Kaia (2/4)	Limassol	132m	433 ft	33	TBA	On Hold	Residential	
8	The Limassol Wharf Project Towers B&C	Limassol	128m	420 ft	31	TBA	Approved	Residential	Investors from China have acquired the 'LOEL' plot, in the Karnagio area and are planning the construction of three high-rise residential towers. / No works have begun as of yet

== Tallest structures ==
The following is a list of all structures in Cyprus, other than buildings, with a height greater than 100 meters. A structure differs from a high-rise by its lack of floors and habitability.

Rank	Name	City	Use	Height	
1	Psimolofou Radio Mast	Nicosia	Antenna	193m	633 ft
2	Chimney of Vasilikos Power Station	Larnaca	Energy generation	138m	452.7 ft

== See also ==
- List of tallest buildings in Europe
- List of tallest buildings in the world
- List of tallest buildings in Malta
- List of tallest buildings in Israel
