= 1004 Estate =

Housing estate in Lagos State, Nigeria

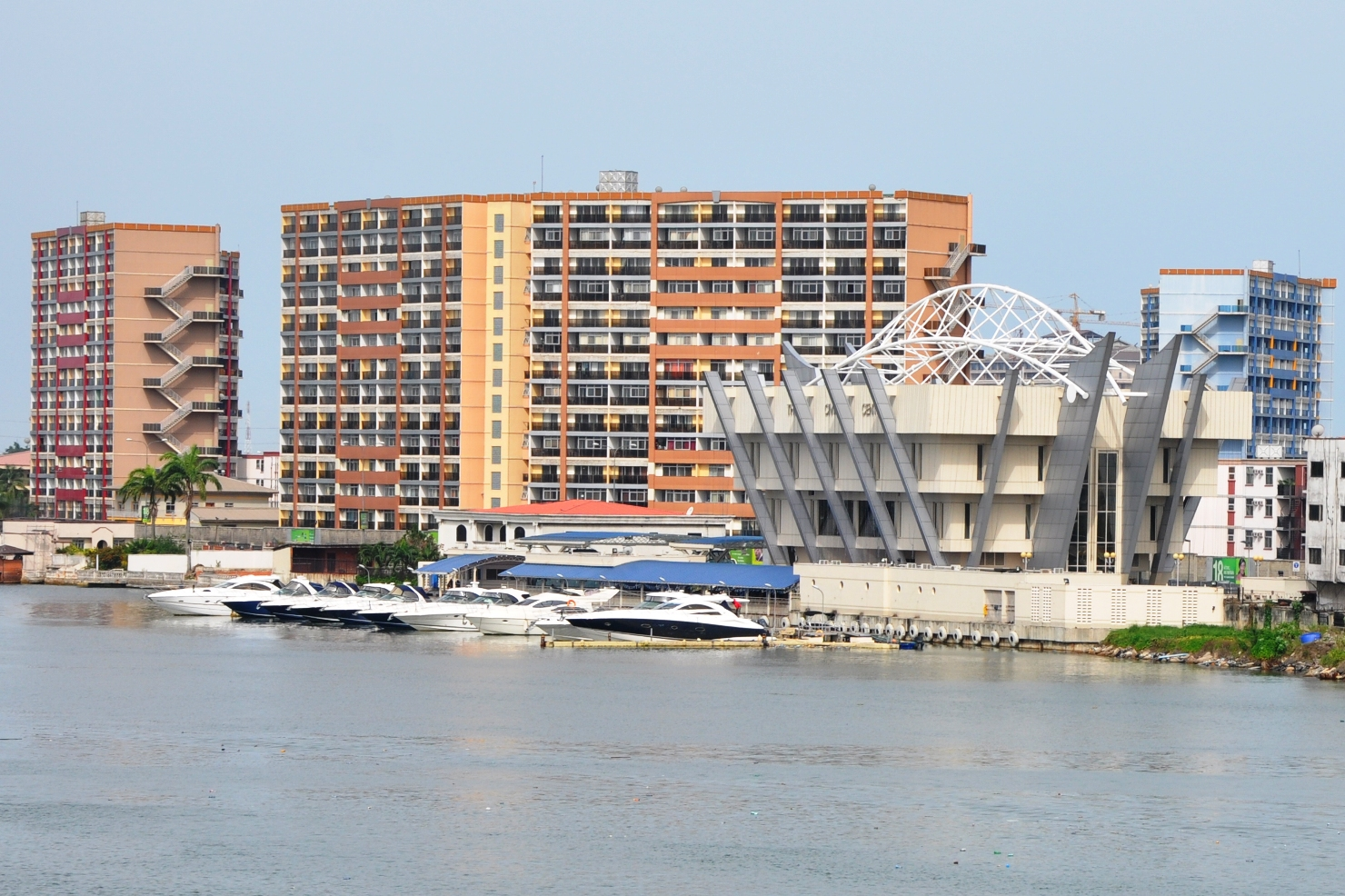
Some of the 1004 estate high rise buildings shown in the background

1004 Housing Estate is an 11-hectare housing estate in Victoria Island, Lagos. Originally named Federal Housing Estate, Lagos and designed by Isaac Fola-Alade, it was constructed in the 1970s as the biggest of its type at the time. The estate has 4 clusters of residential multistory condominiums; 6 high rise buildings and 4 low rise buildings comprising over 1000 apartments. Built as a luxurious residence for families of senators and members of the House of Representatives, the estate opened in 1979. After the federal capital was moved to Abuja, it was subsequently occupied by senior federal civil servants. The estate has also been the abode of expatriates. In 2004, the estate was sold to UACN Property Development Company. In 2007, the estate was involved in a bidding process by the government to hand over maintenance to private property developers. The deal worth 7 billion Naira was Nigeria's single largest property transaction that year.

== Controversies ==
The 1004 estate has been rocked by countless controversies since the transfer ownership from the Federal Government occurred. The 1004 now the abode of expatriates and other private individuals have had to deal with various issues some bordering on embezzlement, fraud, theft and insecurity. In 2021 a man leapt to his death for fear of the Economic and Financial Crimes Commission, an agency in charge of corrupt practices.

The residents of the estate claim that security agencies in charge of the estate aid criminals who tamper with their electricity and property. The cry of help directed to the government. The Lagos State Assembly Committee for housing paid a surprise visit to investigate the crisis rocking the estate.
