= Isaac Fola-Alade =

Nigerian architect (1933–2021)

- Born: Isaac Folayan Alade; 24 November 1933; Aramoko, Ekiti State, Nigeria
- Died: 19 June 2021 (aged 87)
- Education: Christ's School Ado Ekiti; Ahmadu Bello University; Architectural Association, London
- Occupation: Architect
- Spouse: Eunice Yemi Alade
- Children: 5
- Practice: Fola Alade Associates
- Buildings: 1004 Housing Estate; National Stadium, Lagos; Federal Secretariat building, Ikoyi, Lagos; Nigerian Embassy buildings
- Projects: Satellite Town, Lagos; Tafawa Balewa Square, Lagos

Isaac Folayan Alade (24 November 1933 – 19 June 2021) was a Nigerian architect.

== Biography ==
=== Education ===
Isaac attended St Phillips Elementary School in Aramoko, Ekiti and Christ's School, Ado Ekiti for his secondary education. In 1961, he graduated from the Nigerian College of Arts & Sciences and Technology Zaria (now Ahmadu Bello University) as one of the first four pioneer architecture graduates. Thereafter, he completed his post graduate studies at the Architectural Association School of Tropical Studies, London, in 1965, on a Commonwealth Scholarship offer.

=== Career ===
After his post-professional training, he became an associate of the Royal Institute of British Architects (R.I.B.A.) and Architects' Registration Council of the United Kingdom (ARCUK) in 1963. He joined the Federal Ministry of Works and Housing as a Resident architect in the old Western Region and later Lagos City Council. In 1969, he became the first Registrar of the Architects Registration Council of Nigeria (ARCON). He later joined the Federal Civil Service. He became a Fellow of the Royal Society of Health of the UK (F.R.S.H.) in 1965. He became Chief Project Architect in 1972, and the Director of Public Buildings in 1975. He was the first architect to become a Federal Permanent Secretary in 1976, a post he held until his retirement in 1979, after which he established his private practice, Fola Alade Associates, in 1979. He served as the General Secretary of the Nigerian Institute of Architects. He was appointed Pro-Chancellor and Chairman Governing Council of the Federal University of Port Harcourt in 1990.Fola Alade was awarded an OFR and he became a Fellow of the Nigerian Institute of Architects. He also held several traditional titles including the Maiyegun of Aramoko.

=== Personal life ===
Fola Alade married Yemi in 1961. They had five children. Fola Alade passed on June 19 th 2021 at the age of 87

== Selected works ==
- 1004 Housing Estate, Victoria Island, Lagos.
- Federal Secretariat building, Ikoyi, Lagos.
- National Stadium, Lagos
- Remembrance Arcade, Tafawa Balewa Square, Lagos.
- Satellite Town, Lagos
- Nigerian Airforce base, Ikeja.
- Nigerian Institute of Policy and Strategic Studies building, Kuru, Plateau State.
- National Judicial institute, Abuja.
- Nigerian Embassy buildings in 11 countries.
