= Georgios Frangoudes =

Cypriot journalist

- Γεώργιος Φραγκούδης

Member of the Hellenic Parliament
- In office 1923–1926

Personal details
- Born: 1869 Limassol, Ottoman Cyprus
- Died: August 7, 1939 (aged 69–70) Athens, Kingdom of Greece
- Education: University of Athens; École libre des sciences politiques
- Occupation: Lawyer, Social Scientist, Journalist, Newspaper Publisher, Writer, Historian, Politician
- Known for: Founding Panteion University

Georgios Frangoudes (Greek: Γεώργιος Φραγκούδης) (Limassol, 1869 – Athens, 7 August 1939) was a Cypriot lawyer, social scientist, journalist, newspaper publisher, writer, historian, politician and one of the co-founders and first director of Panteion University.

== Early life and education ==
Frangoudes was born in Limassol in 1869, the son of Socrates Frangoudes (Σωκράτης Φραγκούδης) (1869–1939), of the well known Frangoudes family of Limassol. His family arrived in Limassol from Trieste in the 1770s, ultimately originating in Kefalonia. His mother was Zoe Pilavaki (Ζωή Πιλαβάκη), from another historic family of Limassol, also with roots from Eptanisa. Socrates was a member of the Legislative Council of Cyprus, representing the district of Paphos. Later he became the first director of the Ottoman Bank's branch in Limassol. Georgios had three siblings Aikaterini Palaiologos, Nicholas Frangoudes and Augusta Frangoudi Evangelides. He was first cousin, from his father's side, of Menelaos and Nicholas Frangoudis and Simos Menardos.

He went to the Co-educational School of Limassol (Αλληλοδιδακτικό Σχολείο) and studied under important teachers of the time including, Demetrios Nicolaides, Andreas Themistocleous and Aristotelis Palaiologos. After finishing this school at 15, he went to Athens in 1884 in order to get a high school diploma. In 1885 at the age of 16 he began studying law at the University of Athens, graduating in 1890. Then he studied political science at the École libre des sciences politiques in Paris and then he went to London to learn English. In 1897 due to the outbreak of the Greco-Turkish war, he went to Alexandria to learn French.

== Career ==
In Athens he founded the Patriotic Association of Cypriots (Πατριωτικός Σύνδεσμος Κυπρίων) in 1898. As its president he organised in Zappeion in 1901 the first exposition of Cypriot agricultural products that included demonstrations of traditional dances and athletic games. The expo was inaugurated by Spyridon Mercouris, mayor of Athens and the Cypriot participants were welcomed by Kostis Palamas with the poem "Καλῶς μᾶς ἤρθατε παιδιά". Furthermore, the expo was visited by king George I. Additionally, in 1898 he founded and was president of the Association of Cypriots in Athens (Σύνδεσμος Κυπρίων Αθηνών).

=== Journalist ===
As a journalist he published fiery pro enosis articles in 1898-1899 for the Limassol newspaper Αλήθεια, in which he was chief editor. Later, he founded in Limassol the first daily newspaper of Cyprus, Φώς (26 April 1920 - 6 May 1920). In Athens he was the founder and editor the political newspaper Μεταρύθμισις (1904–1905, 1921–1923), the newspaper followed the Venizelist line. For his journalism in Μεταρύθμισις he was imprisoned in Athens in 1904. In its second iteration the newspaper acted as the mouthpiece of the National Democratic Party (Greece). In 1929 he was publishing articles in the Athenian press shelving enosis for Cyprus and supporting political reform within the British empire.

=== Lawyer ===
Frangoudes worked as an advocate in Athens. Subsequently, he practiced law in Alexandria (1905–1910) and then in Khartoum (1911–1916) after which he returned to Athens in 1918.

=== Political scientist and academic ===
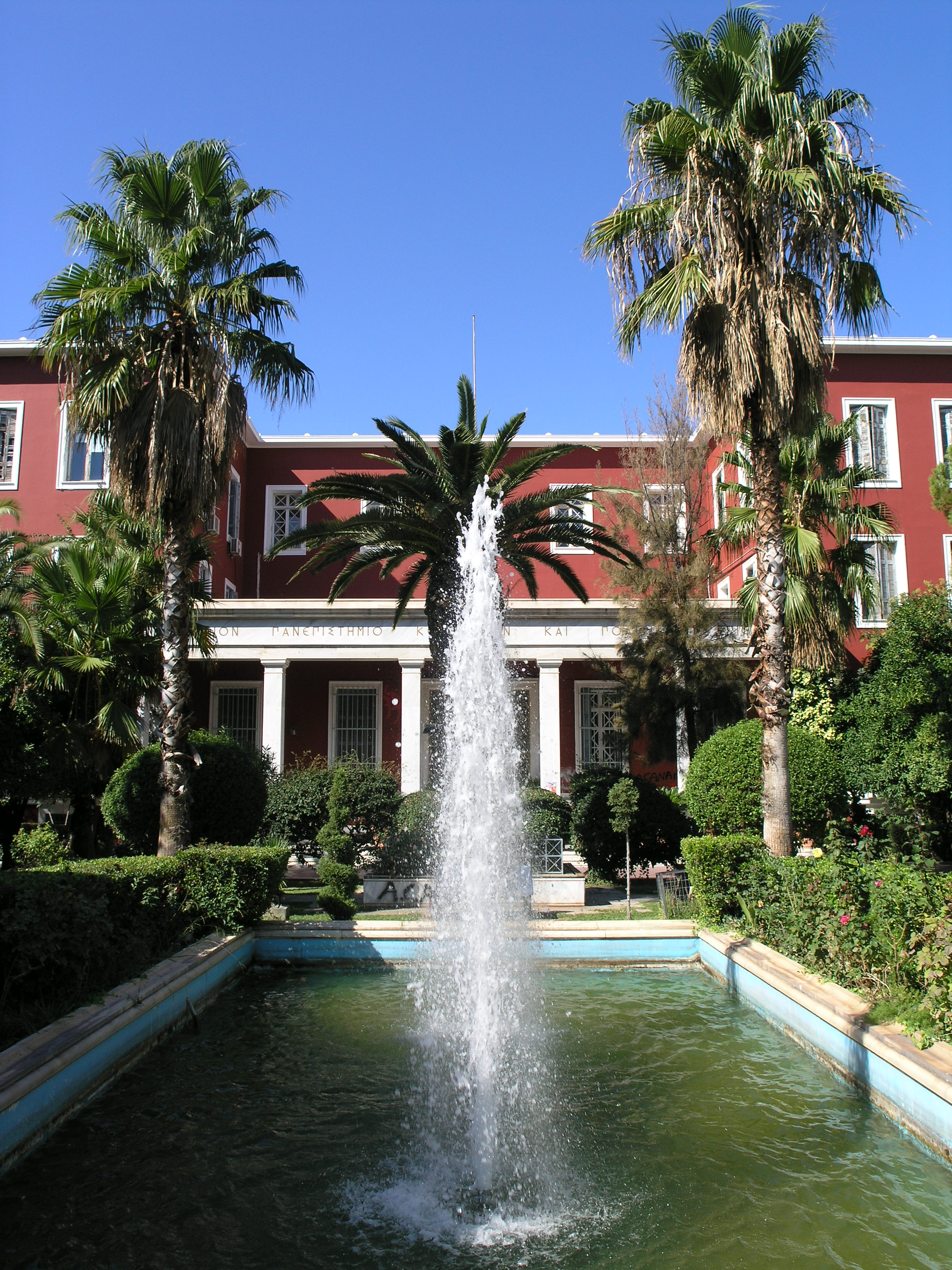
The first, historic building of Panteion University of Social and Political Sciences, classes started on 18 November 1930.

In 1924 he founded and was the president of Εκπαιδευτική Αναγέννησις (Educational Rebirth). With this company he started fundraising for the creation of a university for social sciences. To achieve this he travelled to the UK, Egypt and the US, where he stayed for one year. He also got a bank loan and a grand from the Greek government. He bought a plot of land on Andrea Syngrou Avenue, where the first building of the Panteion University was built, the foundation stone was laid in 1927, and the construction was completed by 1930.

He is the co-founder of the university along with Alexandros Pantos. Pantos bequeathed 450,000 drachmas in his will saying that a school of social sciences should be founded and named after him, placing the Greek state and specifically the Greek prime minister as the guard of the money. Pantos was also a graduate of law at the University of Athens and of political sciences at the École libre des sciences politiques. The men dreamed of creating in Greece a school of political science like Sciences Po.

The school was named Ελευθέρα Σχολή Πολιτικών Οικονομικών Επιστημών (Free School of Political and Economic Sciences) and started operating on 18 November 1930, in 1931 it was renamed Panteion Senior School of Political Studies (Πάντειος Σχολή Πολιτικών Επιστημών), in honor and according to the will of Alexandros Pantos. The inauguration was done by Eleftherios Venizelos. The initial curriculum included five disciplines: 1. Politics, 2. Law, 3. Economics, 4. Sociology, Criminology and Penitentiary, 5. Journalism, Geography and Philosophy.

In the school Frangoudes worked as a teacher, teaching Modern Greek history, and as first head of the school (1930–1937). Frangoudes donated his personal library, paintings, statues and other artefacts to the Panteion. In 1937, Panteion came under public ownership and was recognised as a university and the Metaxas regime dismissed him from his position.

=== Politician ===
He was elected to Parliament in the 1923 Greek legislative election, representing Athens-Piraeus.

Frangoudes was a proponent of Greek Cypriot nationalism, similarly to Christodoulos Sozos, mayor of Limassol. He was a member of the masonic Zenon lodge founded in Limassol in 1893 and played a key role in the dissemination of Greek nationalism.

Although in his early years he was a staunch proponent of enosis. His ideology was influenced by the Party of Radicals (Ionian Islands). Additionally, he was influenced by Venizelos' ideas and consequently favoured first Cypriot autonomy within the British Empire and then enosis, similarly to the United States of the Ionian Islands. He was a collaborator of Eleftherios Venizelos, he supported him during the National Schism, and they both retained a critical stance against the 1931 Cyprus revolt. His change in his stance from enosis to autonomy was fiercely opposed by other writers of the time and he was attacked by Cypriot students at the Panteion. In 1933 Frangoudes published a proposed constitution for the Cyprus State, based on the constitutions of Greece and Malta. He presented his constitution to Edward Stubbs, British governor of Cyprus, who didn't give the proposal to autonomy any consideration.

=== Historian and writer ===
Frangoudes was an avid writer, leaving works on history, political science and novels. He wrote his first book at the age of 17. He also translated into Greek the work Barabbas, A Dream of the World's Tragedy (1893) by Maria Corelli. In his short stories he employed the use of Cypriot Greek, to give emphasis to folkloric aspects of the Cypriot countryside. Frangoudes historical works give a glimpse of the life on the island in the end of the 19th century.

== Personal life ==
Frangoudes was an avid trekker, he trekked Cyprus, Greece, Asia Minor, various European countries (Paris-Brussels), Africa and America.

He married Sofia and they had three children, Hermes Frangoudes (17 Jan. 1921 – 10 June 1980), Zoe Frangoudes (2 Nov. 1935 – 26 Jan. 2003) and Athinais Antoniades (b. 7.4.1924). Hermes and Zoe both studied political sciences and then worked in Panteion. Zoe worked at Panteion as an administrative officer and director of the library until 1998. Hermes worked at first as a writer until 1941 where he left due to the Second World War, where he participated in the Greek resistance, in 1945 he returned to Cyprus. He had a house in Agios Theros in Karpasia, where he hid wanted fighters of EOKA. During the intercommunal fight in 1964 he volunteered in the Cypriot Army and during the Turkish invasion of Cyprus in 1974 he held the rank of an officer. Three of his own children fought in the 1974 war Georgios, Stephanos and Socratis. Georgios works as an editor.

He spent the last years of his life in Kallithea. He died on 7 August 1939 at Evangelismos Hospital in Athens. Following his wishes, his daughter Athinais moved his tomb in 1952 from Athens to Limassol where he was entered in the family tomb at Agios Nikolaos cemetery. His wife Sofia died on 16 November 1976 and his son Hermes were buried in the same plot.

== Legacy ==
In 2010 the Cyprus University of Technology and the Panteion University held an event in memory of Frangoudes where Panteion gifted a bust of Frangoudes by Dimitrios Talaganis. There is a bust of Frangoudes and Pantos outside of the Frangoudes museum at Panteion University, that was created in 2014. In 2015 Frangoudes was commemorated by a stamp from the Cyprus Post.

== See also ==
- Simos Menardos
- Christodoulos Sozos

== Publications ==
- Φραγκούδης. Γ. Σ. (1887). Ελληνικά πολιτεύματα γενομένα από του 1821 μέχρι του 1864. Εν Αθήναις: Eκ του τυπογραφείου των καταστημάτων Ανέστη Κωνσταντινίδου.
- Φραγκούδης. Γ. Σ. (1890). Κύπρις. Εν Αθήναις: Εκδότης Αλέξανδρος Παπαγεωργίου.
- Φραγκούδης. Γ. Σ. (1894). Τά Ὄνειρα. (μυθιστόρημα).
- Φραγκούδης. Γ. Σ. (1895). Περί φυλακών και φυλακισμένων εν Ευρώπη και εν Ελλάδι. Εν Αθήναις: Εκ του Τυπογραφείου των Καταστημάτων Ανέστη των Καταστημάτων Ανέστη Κωνσταντινίδη.
- Φραγκούδης. Γ. Σ. (1897). Επιστολή Γλάδστωνος προς τον Δούκα Ουεστμίνστερ / Μετάφρασις εκ του αγγλικού μετά προλόγου υπό Γ. Σ. Φραγκούδη. Εν Αθήναις: Αλέξανδρος Παπαγεωργίου.
- Φραγκούδης. Γ. Σ. (19 Μαρτίου 1898). Δημώδεις κυπριακή ποίησις. Αλήθεια. 24, 1–2.
- Φραγκούδης. Γ. Σ.. Ἡ Κωνσταντινούπολις.
- Φραγκούδης. Γ. Σ. (1904). Ἡ ἃλωσις τῆς Κύπρου ὑπό τῶν Τούρκων. Εν Αθήναις: Φέξης.
- Φραγκούδης. Γ. Σ. (1908). Ἱστορία τοῦ ἀρχιεπισκοπικοῦ ζητήματος Κύπρου. Eν Αλεξανδρεία.
- Φραγκούδης. Γ. Σ. (1925). Τό Ἑλληνικόν Ἔθνος.
- Frangoudis. G. S. (1925). Le peuple grec aux nations liberales: L' Hellenisme luttant pendant trois mille ans contre la barbarie l' Orient et de l' Occident. Athenes: Imprimerrie Franco-Hellenique.
- Φραγκούδης. Γ. Σ. (1925). Τό Ρωμαίικο.
- Φραγκούδης. Γ. Σ. (1927). Ἑλληνικά Προβλήματα, Εθνική Αναγέννησις. Αλεξάνδρεια: Εκδοτικός Οίκος Α. Κασιγόνη.
- Φραγκούδης. Γ. Σ. (1933). Η Κύπρος αυτόνομος υπό τον έλεγχον της Μεγάλης Βρεττανίας: Σχέδιον Συντάγματος της Κυπριακής Πολιτείας. Εν Αθήναις: Τύποις Ν. Απατσίδη.
- Φραγκούδης. Γ. Σ. (1938). Ἐκπαιδευτική Μεταρρύθμισις.
- Φραγκούδης. Γ. Σ. (1939). Ιστορία και γενεαλογία της μεγάλης κυπριακής οικογένειας Φραγκούδη και των συγγενικών οικογενειών. Aθήνα: Τυποις Ν. Απατσίδη.
- Φραγκούδης. Γ. Σ. (1939). Οι Αγώνες μου.
