= Christos Yannaras =

Greek philosopher, theologian and author (1935–2024)

- Χρήστος Γιανναράς
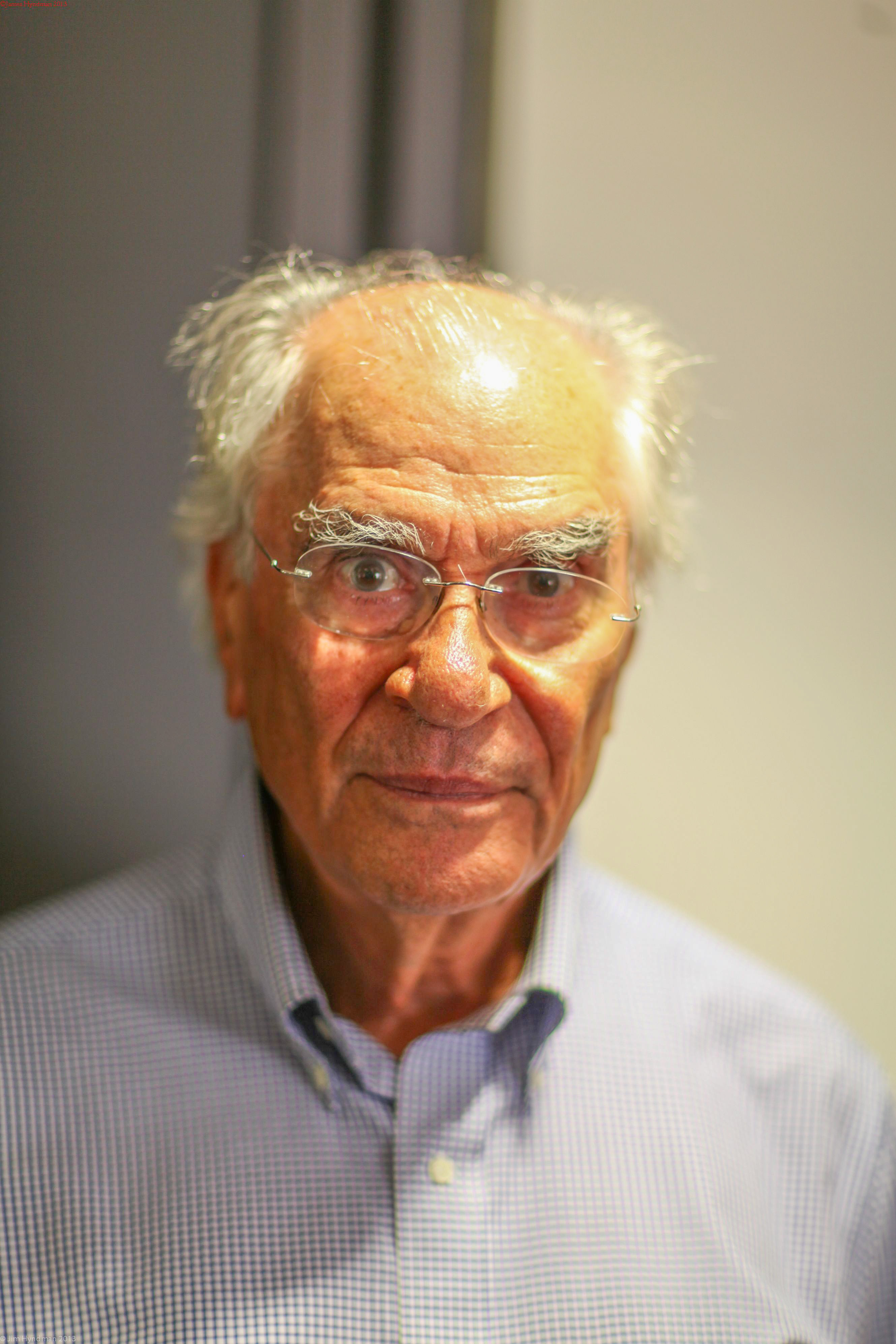
- Yannaras in 2013
- Born: 10 April 1935; Athens, Greece
- Died: 24 August 2024 (aged 89); Kythira, Greece
- Resting place: First Cemetery of Athens
- Citizenship: Greece
- Spouse: Tatiana Ioannou-Yannara
- Children: 2

Education
- Education: University of Paris, University of Athens, University of Bonn

Philosophical work
- Era: Contemporary philosophy
- Region: Western philosophy
- School: Neo-orthodoxy (Eastern Orthodoxy)
- Institutions: Panteion University of Social and Political Sciences, University of Geneva, University of Lausanne
- Main interests: Metaphysics, Eastern Orthodox theology, political philosophy

Christos Yannaras (/jɑːnəˈrɑːs/; also Giannaras; Greek: Χρήστος Γιανναράς [janaˈras]; 10 April 1935 – 24 August 2024) was a Greek philosopher, Eastern Orthodox theologian and author of more than 50 books which have been translated into many languages. He was a professor emeritus of philosophy at the Panteion University of Social and Political Sciences, Athens.

== Biography ==
Yannaras was born in Athens. He studied theology at the University of Athens and philosophy at the University of Bonn (Germany) and the University of Paris (France). He received a Ph.D. from the Faculty of Theology at the Aristotle University of Thessaloniki (Greece). He held also a Ph.D of the Faculté des Lettres et Sciences Humaines at the Sorbonne-University of Paris IV. He had been a visiting professor at the universities of Paris (the Catholic Faculty), Geneva, Lausanne and Crete. He was Professor of Philosophy at the Panteion University of Social and Political Sciences in Athens, from 1982 to 2002. He was an elected member of the Hellenic Authors' Society and International Academy of Human Sciences (Brussels).

He held honorary doctorates (honoris causa) from the University of Belgrade, St. Vladimir's Seminary in New York, Hellenic College Holy Cross, New Georgian University in Poti and National and Kapodistrian University of Athens. In 2019 Ecumenical Patriarch awarded him the Offikion of Archon Grand Rhetor of the Holy Great Church of Christ.

The main volume of Yannaras' work represents a long course on study and research of the differences between the Greek and Western European philosophy and tradition, differences that are not limited to the level of theory only but also define a praxis (mode of life).

Christos Yannaras appears in the video "Rhetoric-Hill of the Pnix" directed in 2017 by French artist Youssef Tabti. Over the course of 40 minutes, C. Yannaras shares his views on freedom of expression and democracy, as they were experienced in ancient Athens and as we know them today.

Yannaras died in the island of Kythira on 24 August 2024, at the age of 89.

== Selected bibliography ==
In English

- The Freedom of Morality, New York (SVS Press), 1984 (ISBN 0-88141-028-4)
- Elements of Faith, Edinburgh (T&T Clark), 1991 (ISBN 0-567-29190-1)
- On the Absence and Unknowability of God: Heidegger and the Areopagite, London (Continuum, 2005) (ISBN 0-567-08806-5)
- Postmodern Metaphysics, Holy Cross Orthodox Press (Brookline, MA), 2004 (ISBN 1-885652-80-1) table of contents
- Variations on the Song of Songs, Holy Cross Orthodox Press (Brookline, MA), 2005 (ISBN 1-885652-82-8)
- Orthodoxy and the West, Holy Cross Orthodox Press (Brookline, MA), 2006 (ISBN 1-885652-81-X)
- Person and Eros, Holy Cross Orthodox Press (Brookline, MA), 2008 (ISBN 978-1-885652-88-1)
- The Meaning of Reality: Essays on Existence and Communion, Eros and History. Sebastian Press (Los Angeles), 2011 (ISBN 978-1936773039)
- Relational Ontology, Holy Cross Orthodox Press (Brookline, MA), 2011 (ISBN 978-1935317197)
- The Enigma of Evil, Holy Cross Orthodox Press (Brookline, MA), 2012 (ISBN 978-1935317289)
- Against Religion: The Alienation of the Ecclesial Event, Holy Cross Orthodox Press (Brookline, MA), 2013 (ISBN 978-1935317401)

Online texts

- "Pietism as an Ecclesiological Heresy" (Chapter 8 of The Freedom of Morality)
- "The Ethos of Liturgical Art" (Chapter 12 of The Freedom of Morality)
- "The inhuman character of human rights" (synopsis in English of the homonymous Greek book, published by Domos, Athens 1998)
- Yannaras' lecture on "Human rights and the Orthodox Church"
- "Towards a New Ecumenism"
- "A Note on Political Theory" (St. Vladimir's Theological Quarterly, 27:1 (1983), pp. 53–56)
- "The Distinction Between Essence and Energies and its Importance for Theology" Athens, February 1975. Translated from the Greek by the Rev. Peter Chamberas
- Read the chapter "Cantus Firmus" from the "Variations of the song of songs" in Greek" or in English
- First chapter of the author's book Orthodoxy and West in Modern Greece (in Greek)
- Collection of numerous articles in Greek
