= Simos Menardos =

Greek scholar, folklorist and poet (1872–1933)

- Σίμος Μενάρδος
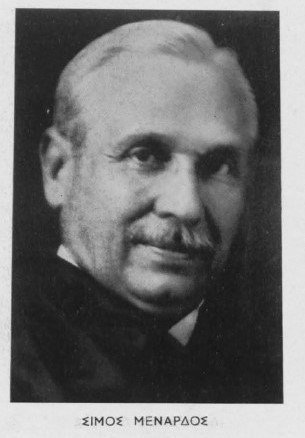

Rector of the University of Athens
- In office 1925–1926

Vice-Rector of the University of Athens
- In office 1924–1925

Personal details
- Born: 1871 Mytilene, Ottoman Greece
- Died: 23 July 1933 (aged 61–62) Athens, Kingdom of Greece
- Education: University of Athens
- Occupation: Academic, Philologist, Folklorist, Educator, Scholar, Writer, Poet

Simos Menardos (Greek: Σίμος Μενάρδος) (Mytilene, 1871 – Athens, 23 July 1933) was a Greek and Cypriot academic, writer, philologist, folklorist, poet, lecturer in Mediaeval and Modern Greek at the University of Oxford, professor of Ancient Greek Philology and later rector of the University of Athens and member of the Academy of Athens and Parnassos Literary Society.

== Early life and education ==
Menardos was the son of Greek diplomat Georgios Menardos (Γεώργιος Μενάρδος) from Tinos and the Greek Cypriot Augousta Frangoudes (Αυγούστα Φραγκούδη), of the well known Frangoudes family of Limassol. He was born in Myteline in 1871, where his father was appointed as vice consul of Greece, and spend his childhood in Cyprus. From his mother's side he was first cousin to the Cypriot journalist and politician Georgios Frangoudes.

He graduated from the Gymnasium of Athens and then studied philology and law at the University of Athens. In the law department he was in the same class as Christodoulos Sozos. Menardos then returned to Cyprus and worked as the principal of the Greek School at Larnaca (Ελληνική Σχολή Λάρνακος) between 1896-1898. Subsequently, from 1898 until 1904, he worked as a lawyer in Limassol. Later, between 1904 and 1907, he undertook post-graduate studies in Italy, France and the UK. From 1907 until 1909 he was appointed superintendent of the Greek schools of Cyprus (the first non-British person to be appointed to this position), and helped to found and organise the Cyprus Museum. He was a member of the Committee of the Cyprus Museum.

== Academic work ==
Menardos specialised in Cypriot medieval and modern philology and dialectology focusing on the Cypriot dialect. He wrote studies on linguistics, toponymy, folklore, mostly about Cyprus, but also Lesbos, Rhodes, Cephalonia, Tinos and Mykonos. He was a translator and epigrammatist. He published a translation of Aristotles' Poetics along with commentary from Ioannis Sykoutris. He published a number of books as well as articles in journals such as Δελτίον Ἰστορικῆς καί Ἐθνολογικῆς Ἑταιρείας, Αθήνα, Νέος Ἑλληνομνήμων, Λαογραφία, Ἐπετηρίς Παρνασσοῦ.

Menardos was appointed to the first Lectureship in Mediaeval and Modern Greek at Oxford University, giving his inaugural lecture on 29 October 1908. He lectured until 1914 when the position was disestablished due to financial reasons. Oxford bestowed him an honorary doctorate. From 1911 until 1933 he was professor of Ancient Greek Philology at the University of Athens, in 1916 and in 1922 he was dean of the School of Philosophy, vice rector (1924–1925) and finally rector (1925–1926). In 1919 he inaugurated the Koraes Chair at King's College, with a series of lectures on modern greek poetry. He also gave lectures on modern Greek poetry at the University of Cambridge. In 1926 he was elected as a member of the Academy of Athens, and he acted as its first General Secretary from 1928 until his death in 1933. He was a member of the Parnassos Literary Society. In 1930 he was president of the Committee of the Troisième Congrès International des études byzantines à Athènes. In 1930 he published his only poetry collection titled Επιγράμματα (Epigrams).

== Legacy ==
Kostis Palamas dedicated a poem to him titled To Simos Menardos (Στον Σίμο Μενάρδο). In honour of his contributions to the study of the Cypriot dialect, the Cyprus University of Technology has named its language center after Menardos.

== Publications ==
- Μενάρδος, Σ. (1894). Φωνητική της διαλέκτου των σημερινών Κυπρίων. Ἀθηνά: σύγγραμμα περιοδικόν της εν Αθήναις Επιστημονικής Εταιρείας, Τόμος ΣΤ', 145–173.
- Μενάρδος, Σ. (1894). Διορθώσεις και προσθήκαι εις την εν σελ. 145 - 173 δημοσιευθείσαν περί της κυπριακής διαλέκτου διατριβήν. Αθηνά: σύγγραμμα περιοδικόν της εν Αθήναις Επιστημονικής Εταιρείας, Τόμος ΣΤ', 462–468.
- Μενάρδος, Σ. (1896). Ἡ γενικὴ κατὰ Κυπρίους. Ἀθηνά: σύγγραμμα περιοδικόν της εν Αθήναις Επιστημονικής Εταιρείας, Τόμος Η', 435–450.
- Μενάρδος, Σ. (1900). Κυπριώτικα τραγούδια. Δελτίον της Ιστορικής και Εθνολογικής Εταιρείας της Ελλάδος, Τόμος 5. Εν Αθήναις: Εκ του Τυπογραφείου Αδελφών Περρή. 327–346.
- Μενάρδος, Σ. (1900). Γαλλικαί μεσαιωνικαί λέξεις εν Κύπρω, Ἀθηνά: σύγγραμμα περιοδικόν της εν Αθήναις Επιστημονικής Εταιρείας, Τόμος ΙΒ', Τεύχος 1, 360–384.
- Μενάρδος, Σ. (1901). Η Ρήγαινα. Δελτίον της Ἱστορικῆς καί Ἐθνολογικῆς Ἑταιρείας της Ἑλλάδος, τόμ. Στ', 117–148.
- Μενάρδος, Σ. (1901). Θρήνος της Κύπρου. Δελτίον της Ἱστορικῆς καί Ἐθνολογικῆς Ἑταιρείας της Ἑλλάδος, τόμ. Στ', 403–423.
- Μενάρδος, Σ. (1904). Περί των ονομάτων των Κυπρίων. Ἀθηνά: σύγγραμμα περιοδικόν της εν Αθήναις Επιστημονικής Εταιρείας, Τόμος ΙΣΤ', 257–294.
- Μενάρδος, Σ. (1906). Θρήνος της Κύπρου. Εν Αθήναις: Εκ του τυπογραφείου Π. Δ. Σακελλάριου.
- Μενάρδος, Σ. (1906). Τοπωνυμικόν της Κύπρου. Ἀθηνά: σύγγραμμα περιοδικόν της εν Αθήναις Επιστημονικής Εταιρείας, Τόμος ΙΗ', 315–421.
- Μενάρδος, Σ. (1907). Τοπωνυμικόν της Κύπρου. Εν Αθήναις: Εκ του τυπογραφείου Π. Δ. Σακελλάριου.
- Μενάρδος, Σ. (15 Μαΐου 1907). Επιγραφαί Ροδίων αμφορέων ευρεθέντων εν Πάφω. Παναθήναια, Έτος Ζ΄, 83–84.
- Μενάρδος, Σ. (1908). “Where Did Aphrodite Find the Body of Adonis?” The Journal of Hellenic Studies 28, 133–137.
- Menardos, S. (1909). The Value of Byzantine and Modem Greek in Hellenic Studies. Oxford: Clarendon Press.
- Μενάρδος, Σ. (1910). Επιτύμβιοι επιγραφαί εκ Κύπρου. Ἀθηνά: σύγγραμμα περιοδικόν της εν Αθήναις Επιστημονικής Εταιρείας, Τόμος ΚΒ', 113–146.
- Μενάρδος, Σ. (1910). Γόλγοι και Εβραίοι. Επιγραφαί εκ Κύπρου. Ἀθηνά: σύγγραμμα περιοδικόν της εν Αθήναις Επιστημονικής Εταιρείας, Τόμος ΚΒ', 417-425.
- Μενάρδος, Σ. (1910). Επιτύμβιοι επιγραφαί εκ Κύπρου. Εν Αθήναις: Εκ του τυπογραφείου Π. Δ. Σακελλάριου.
- Μενάρδος, Σ. (1910). Δύο Ζακυνθηνοί ποιηταί. Αθήναι: Τυπογραφείον "Εστία" Μάινστερ και Καργαδούρη.
- Μενάρδος, Σ. (1910). Η Αγία Ελένη εις την Κύπρον, Λαογραφία, Τόμος Β', Β'-Γ', 264–298.
- Μενάρδος, Σ. (1911). Συμπληρωματικά στο Η Αγία Ελένη εις την Κύπρον, Λαογραφία, Τόμος Β', Δ', 708.
- Μενάρδος, Σ. (1914). Η εν Κύπρω Ιερά Μονή της Παναγίας του Μαχαιρά.
- Μενάρδος, Σ. (1918). Εμμανουήλ Ροΐδης. Εν Αθήναις: Ιωάννης Δ. Κολλάρος.
- Menardos, S. (1919). Greece & Armenia. London, Spottiswoode, Ballantyne & Co. Ltd.
- Μενάρδος, Σ. (1920). Πανηγυρικός εις την προέλασιν του ελληνικού στρατού: εκφωνηθείς τη 13 Μαίου 1920. Εν Αθήναις: Εκ του τυπογραφείου Π. Δ. Σακελλάριου.
- Μενάρδος, Σ. (1921). 1821-1921: Τρεις λόγοι. Εν Αθήναις: Εκδοτικός Οίκος "Ελευθερουδάκης".
- Gilbert M. and Μενάρδος, Σ. (1922). Ιστορία της Αρχαίας Ελληνικής Λογοτεχνίας. Εν Αθήναις: Τύποις Π. Δ. Σακελλάριου.
- Μενάρδος, Σ. (1922). Ἐπιστολή. Νέος Ἑλληνομνήμων, Τόμοι ΙΕ΄-ΚΑ΄, 16, 4, 458–464.
- Μενάρδος, Σ. (1923). Ο κριτής των κριτών: απάντησις. Εν Αθήναις.
- Μενάρδος, Σ. (1923). Ιστορικαί παροιμίαι των Κυπρίων, Λαογραφία, Ζ', 45-52.
- Μενάρδος, Σ. (1924). Στέφανος: Εκλογαί αρχαίων ποιημάτων. Κατά μετάφρασιν Σίμου Μενάρδου. Εν Αθήναις: Εκδότης Ι. Ν. Σιδέρης.
- Μενάρδος, Σ. (1924). Έκθεσις περί των σχολείων της Λάρνακος 1837. Κυπριακά Χρονικά, 2, 278–280.
- Μενάρδος, Σ. (1925). Κυπριακή Γραμματική, Ἀθηνά: σύγγραμμα περιοδικόν της εν Αθήναις Επιστημονικής Εταιρείας, Τόμος ΛΖ', 35–79.
- Μενάρδος, Σ. (1925). Περί των αρκτικών φωνηέντων. Επιστημονική Επετηρίς της Φιλοσοφικής Σχολής του Πανεπιστημίου Αθηνών, Περίοδος Α΄ Τόμος 1, 65–74.
- Μενάρδος, Σ. (1925). Περί της διαθέσεως των κυπριακών ρημάτων. Επιστημονική Επετηρίς της Φιλοσοφικής Σχολής του Πανεπιστημίου Αθηνών, Περίοδος Α΄ Τόμος 1, 75–86.
- Μενάρδος, Σ. (1926). Λόγος εκφωνηθείς εν τη μεγάλη αιθούση του Πανεπιστημίου τη 28 Φεβρουαρίου 1926 κατά την ανάληψιν της πρυτανείας του Πανεπιστημιακού έττους 1925-1926. Εν Αθήναις: Το Αθήνησι Πανεπιστήμιον.
- Μενάρδος, Σ. (1926). Ποιοί ήσαν ο Τσάκωνες. Πρακτικά της Ακαδημίας Αθηνών, 260–265
- Μενάρδος, Σ. (1927). Περί των τοπικών επιθέτων της νεωτέρας ελληνικής. 332–341.
- Μενάρδος, Σ. (1927). Ἀριστοτέλης Βαλαωρίτης. Νέα Ἑστία, 2, 22–24.
- Μενάρδος, Σ. (1928). Τοπωνυμία της νήσου Τήνου. Πρακτικά της Ακαδημίας Αθηνών, 151–160.
- Μενάρδος, Σ. (1928). Μετάφρασις του περι Ασκήσεως Λόγου του Πλουτάρχου. Πρακτικά της Ακαδημίας Αθηνών, 678-679.
- Μενάρδος, Σ. (1929). Η εν Κύπρω Ιερά Μονή της Παναγίας του Μαχαιρά. Πειραιάς.
- Μενάρδος, Σ. (1929). Μεταπλασμοί ονομάτων, Ἀθηνά: σύγγραμμα περιοδικόν της εν Αθήναις Επιστημονικής Εταιρείας, Τόμος ΜΑ', 47–55.
- Μενάρδος, Σ. (1929). Μεταπλασμοί ονομάτων εν τη Νέα Ελληνική. Πρακτικά της Ακαδημίας Αθηνών, 318–319.
- Μενάρδος, Σ. (1929). Περί του σχηματισμού θηλυκών ονομάτων. Πρακτικά της Ακαδημίας Αθηνών, 454–465.
- Μενάρδος, Σ. (1930). Τοπωνυμικόν της Μυκόνου. Επετηρίς Εταιρείας Βυζαντινών Σπουδών, Έτος Ζ’, 240–252.
- Μενάρδος, Σ. (1930). Επιγράμματα. Εν Αθήναις: Εκδότης Ι. Ν. Σιδέρης.
- Μενάρδος, Σ. (1930). Τρία Πατριαρχικά γράμματα προς Αρχιεπισκόπους της Κύπρου. Πρακτικά της Ακαδημίας Αθηνών, 242.
- Μενάρδος, Σ. (1931). Θεοφάνης Κακριδής, Ἀθηνά: σύγγραμμα περιοδικόν της εν Αθήναις Επιστημονικής Εταιρείας, Τόμος ΜΓ', 47–48.
- Μενάρδος, Σ. (1931). Περί των συνθέτων από του έσω και έξω τοπωνυμίων. Επετηρίς Εταιρείας Βυζαντινών Σπουδών, Έτος Η’, 338–341.
- Μενάρδος, Σ. (1931). Περί του Κυπριακού έγκε. Πρακτικά της Ακαδημίας Αθηνών, 476–477.
- Μενάρδος, Σ. (1933). Συμπληρωματικαί συμπληρώσεις περί του Hase. Πρακτικά της Ακαδημίας Αθηνών, 70–71.
- Μενάρδος, Σ. (1954). Ενας χαρακτηρισμός: ο Ψυχάρης, η δημοτική, η εποχή του. Ελευθερία, 9 Μαϊου 1954.
- Μενάρδος, Σ. (1969). Γλωσσικαί Μελέται. Λευκωσία: Κέντρον Επιστημονικών Ερευνών Κύπρου.
- Μενάρδος, Σ. (1970). Τοπωνυμικαί και Λαογραφικαί Μελέται. Δημοσιεύματα του Κέντρου Επιστημονικών Ερευνών, 4. Λευκωσία: Κέντρον Επιστημονικών Ερευνών Κύπρου.

== Publications about Menardos ==
- Συκουτρής, Ι. (1933). Σίμος Μενάρδος. Αθήναι: Τύποις Παρασκευάς Λεωνή.
- Tillyrides, A. (1979). Unpublished letters of Simos Menardos, Κυπριακαί Σπουδαί, 43.
- Κασίνης, Κ. Γ. (1982). Ο Σίμος Μέναρδος και η Υποψηφιότητα του Παλαμά για το Βραβείο Νόμπελ. Αθήνα.
- Χρυσάνθης. Κ. (1989). Μια επιστολή του Σίμου Γ. Μενάρδου. Εταιρία Κυπριακών Σπουδών. Λευκωσία.
