= Limassol Public Gardens =

Public Gardens in Limassol, Cyprus

- Limassol Municipal Garden
- Δημόσιος Κήπος Λεμεσού (Greek); Δημοτικός Κήπος Λεμεσού
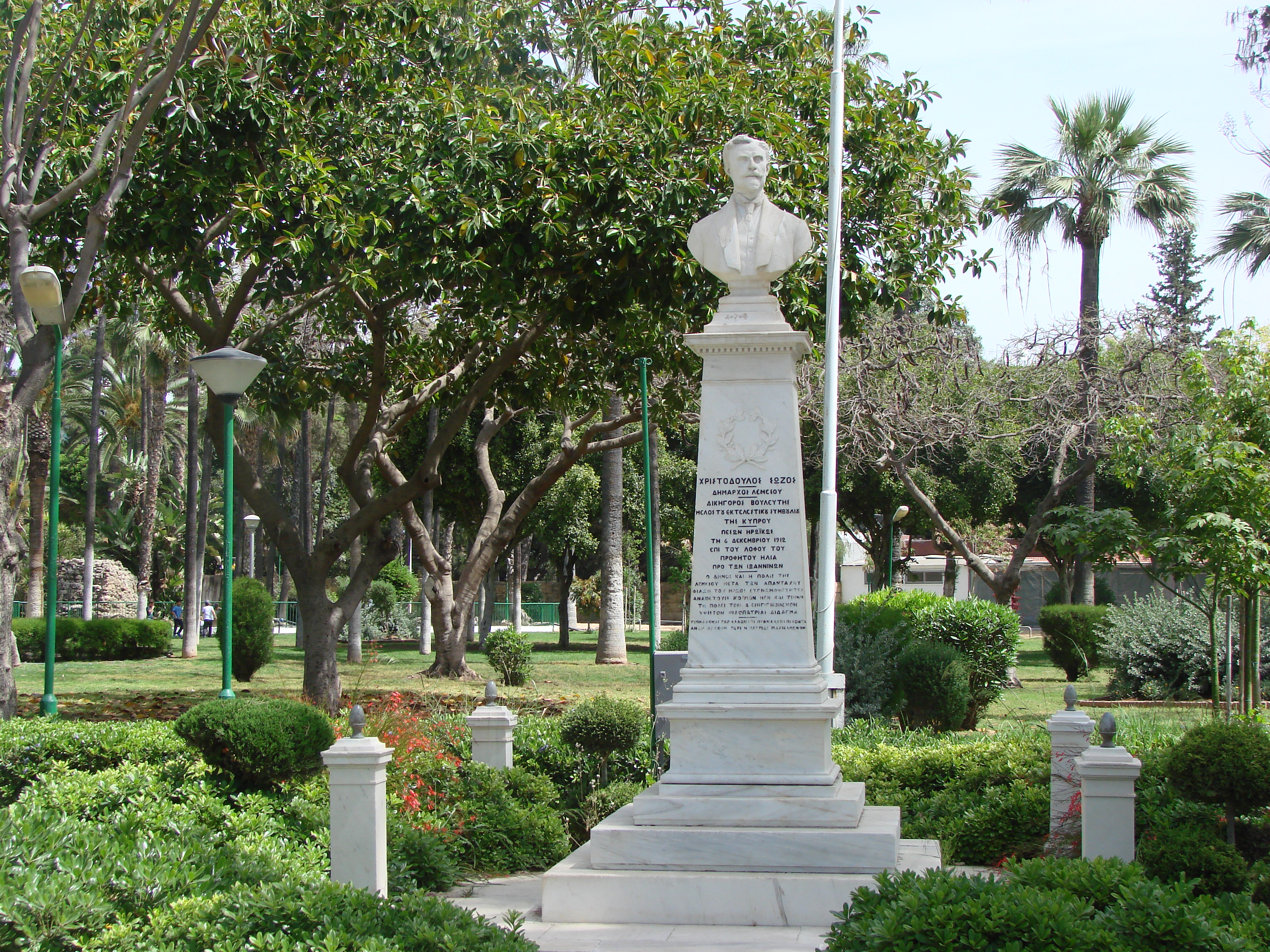
- Statue of Christodoulos Sozos in the Gardens
- Interactive map of Limassol Public Gardens
- Type: Garden
- Location: Limassol, Cyprus
- Coordinates: 34.683295885756124°N 33.0549949548804°E
- Area: 60,000 square metres (15 acres)
- Opened: 1888; 138 years ago

The Limassol Public Gardens, (Note: Greek: Δημόσιος Κήπος Λεμεσού, romanized: Dimósiós Kípos Lemesoú) also known as the Limassol Municipal Garden, (Note: Greek: Δημοτικός Κήπος Λεμεσού, romanized: Dimotikós Kípos Lemesoú) is a recreational space dating back to the 19th century, in Limassol, the second largest city of the island nation of Cyprus. The Limassol Zoo is located within the gardens.

== History ==
Built in 1888, when the British colonial administration wanted to establish a space for the residents of the city. The gardens were officially opened to the public after the seaside location was selected. Since then, they have become an integral part of the city’s urban landscape. This popular oasis, located in the heart of town near the Molos promenade, offers a serene and picturesque park that serves as a peaceful retreat for all visitors.

== Features ==
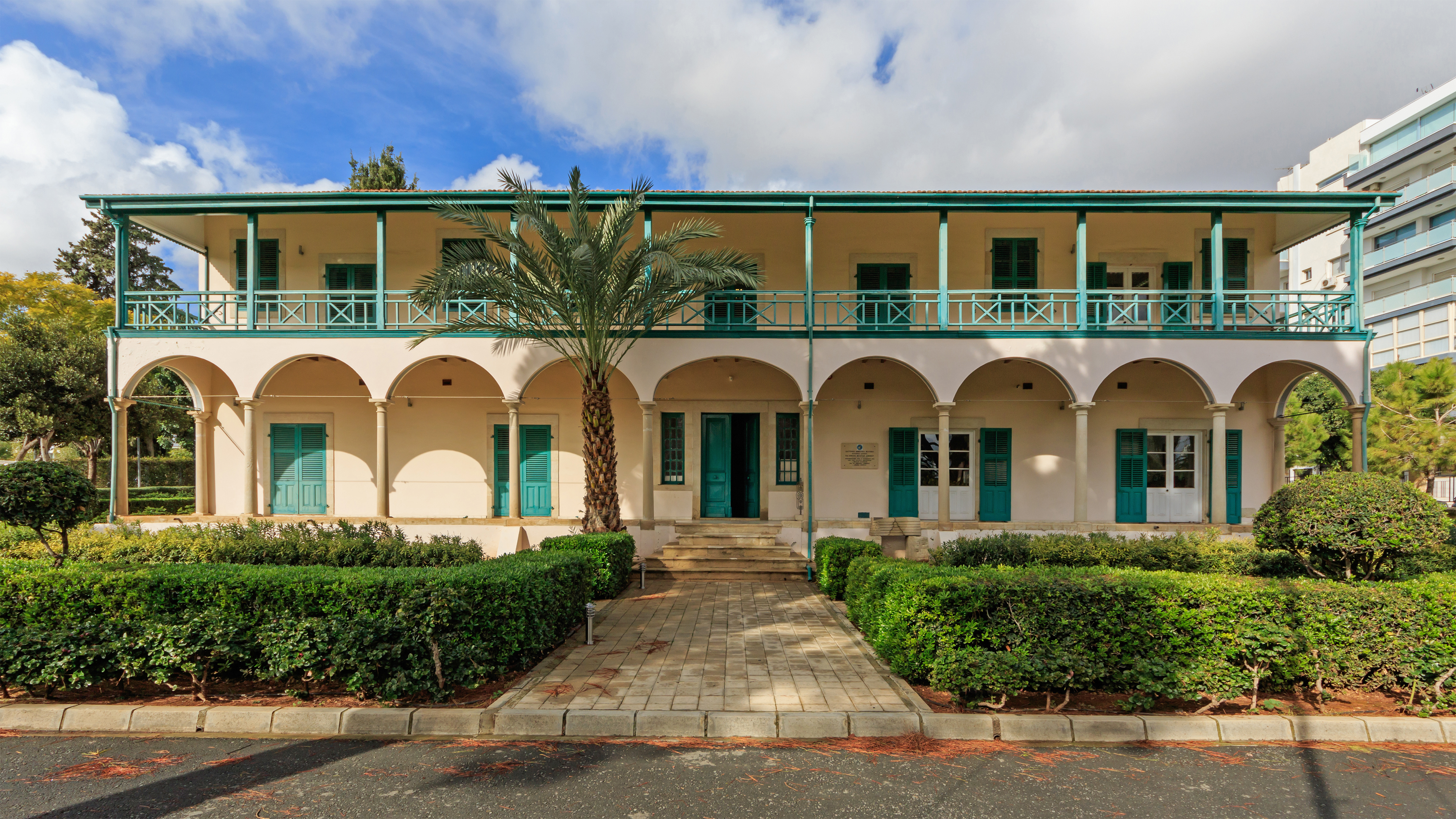
Patticheio Municipal Museum in the gardens

The Gardens have a diverse array of botanical offerings, with a variety of plants and eucalyptus trees, pine trees and cypresses. The area acts as a hub for social activity and community engagement, which is why many local and national events take place in the gardens. Many playgrounds can be found on the premises, as well as an open-air stage hosting many concerts, and the Limassol Zoo, with a diverse range of animals. The Patticheio Municipal Museum can also be found in the gardens, while the Limassol Archaeological Museum is right next to the gardens.

== Events ==
The Gardens are used as a venue for many events, including the Seaside Street Food Festival, and the grand annual Wine Festival of Cyprus.
