= Yiorgos Veltsos =

Greek philosopher, author, poet, and academic (born 1944)

Yiorgos Veltsos (Greek: Γιώργος Βέλτσος; born October 1944) is a Greek philosopher, author, poet, and former academic professor.

== Biography ==
Veltsos was born in Athens, Greece. He studied Law at the Aristotle University of Thessaloniki and received his doctoral degree in Political Sociology from the University of Vincennes in Saint-Denis. From 1975 onward, Veltsos taught communication theory at the Panteion University in Athens, where he became associate professor in 1980, and professor of Sociology in 1985.

A collection of Veltsos's theatrical works have been published in French with a foreword by Jacques Derrida. Selections of his poetry have been translated into English, French and German. In his discussions of social institutions and ideology, he often took a semiotic point of view.

Over the years, and since the 1970s, Veltsos has written as a guest columnist on various subjects, including travel or food, mainly in the daily newspaper Ta Nea. In the 1990s, he initiated and was featured in a series of interviews with European philosophers, such as Felix Guattari, for state television in Greece.

In 2012, Veltsos was named chevalier des Arts et des Lettres by the French state.

== Selected bibliography ==
- Skia/Shadow, Athens: Indiktos 2004, 149pp, ISBN 960-518-187-8 (in English)
- Humus. Camera degli sposi, Athènes: Institut Français d'Athènes, 2000, 163pp, ISBN 960-8473-29-2 (in French)

=== In Greek ===
- Κοινωνιολογία των θεσμών Ι – Ο θεσμικός λόγος και η εξουσία (Sociology of Institutions: The Institutional Logos and Power), 1977
- Κοινωνιολογία των θεσμών ΙΙ – Οικογένεια και φαντασιακές σχέσεις (Sociology of Institutions: Family and Imaginary Relations), 1979
- Η τερατώδης πλευρά (The Monstrous Side), 1985
- Προς τον Κορνήλιο Καστοριάδη (To Cornelius Castoriadis), 1989
- Το πρωτότυπο έχει χαθεί (The Prototype has been Lost), 2001
- Ποιήματα 1993–2005 (Poems 1993–2005), 2006
- Πρωτόκολλα ονείρων (Dream Protocols), 2013
