= Limassol Molos =

Seaside Park in Limassol, Cyprus

- Μόλος Λεμεσού (Greek)
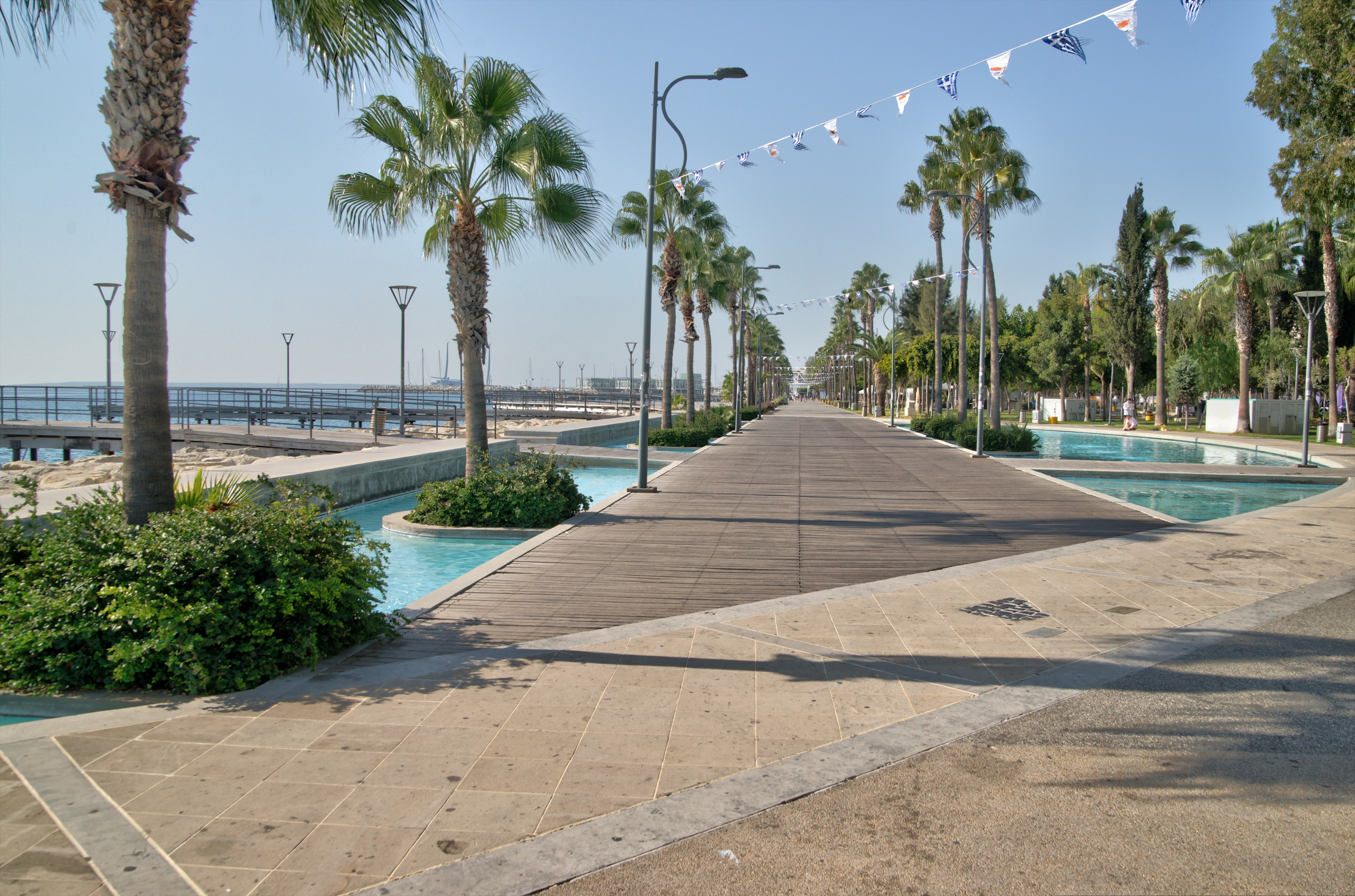
- Ground view of the park
- Interactive map of Limassol Molos
- Type: Public park
- Location: Limassol, Cyprus
- Coordinates: 34.676583°N 33.049791°E
- Area: 65,000 square metres (16 acres)

Limassol Molos (Greek: Μόλος Λεμεσού, romanized: Mólos Lemesoú), formally known as the Limassol Multifunctional Seaside Park, is a multifunctional park and promenade of land reclamation in Limassol, the second largest city in Cyprus. It consists of a collection of sculptures by multiple artists, playgrounds, piers, and is considered one of the vital hotspots of the city, and one of its symbols. The park is one of the largest on the island.

== History ==
During Ottoman rule, the seafront of Limassol was completely different than what it is today. The area of the park used to consist of a long borderlike line of houses, warehouses and offices. This restricted the movement of the citizens, which was the standard way of living during Ottoman rule.

After the Cyprus convention of 1878, a secret agreement between the Ottomans and Britain which ceded administrative power to the British, the seafront of the city began transforming into what we see today, after the British governor ordered the demolition of the houses which had their walls facing the sea, as well as the construction of the first major pier. Beginning in 1908, Christodoulos Sozos, the then mayor, began the transformation of the seafront, which was also when electric lighting was introduced to the seafront.

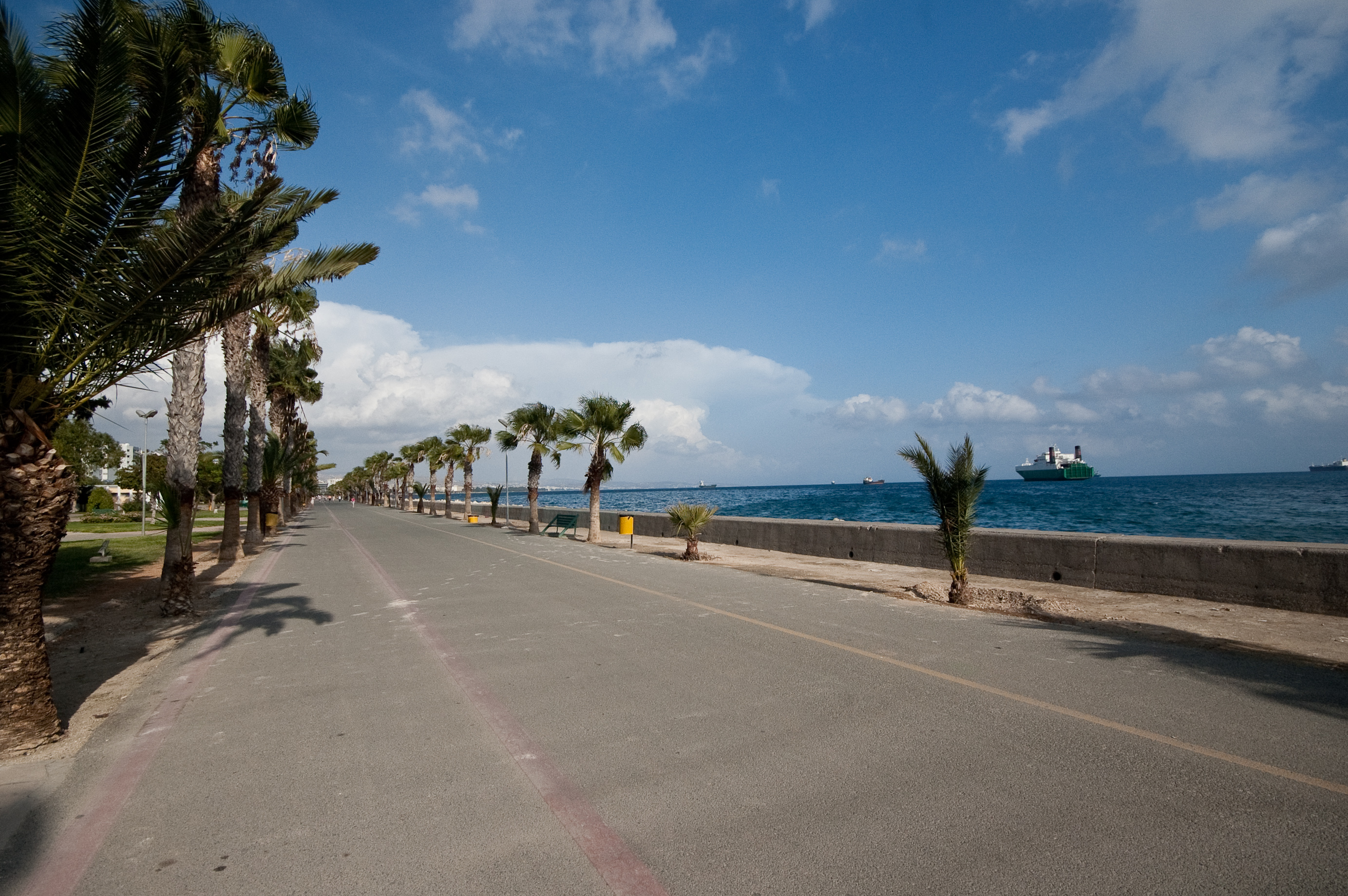
Limassol Molos, Before redevelopment, 2009

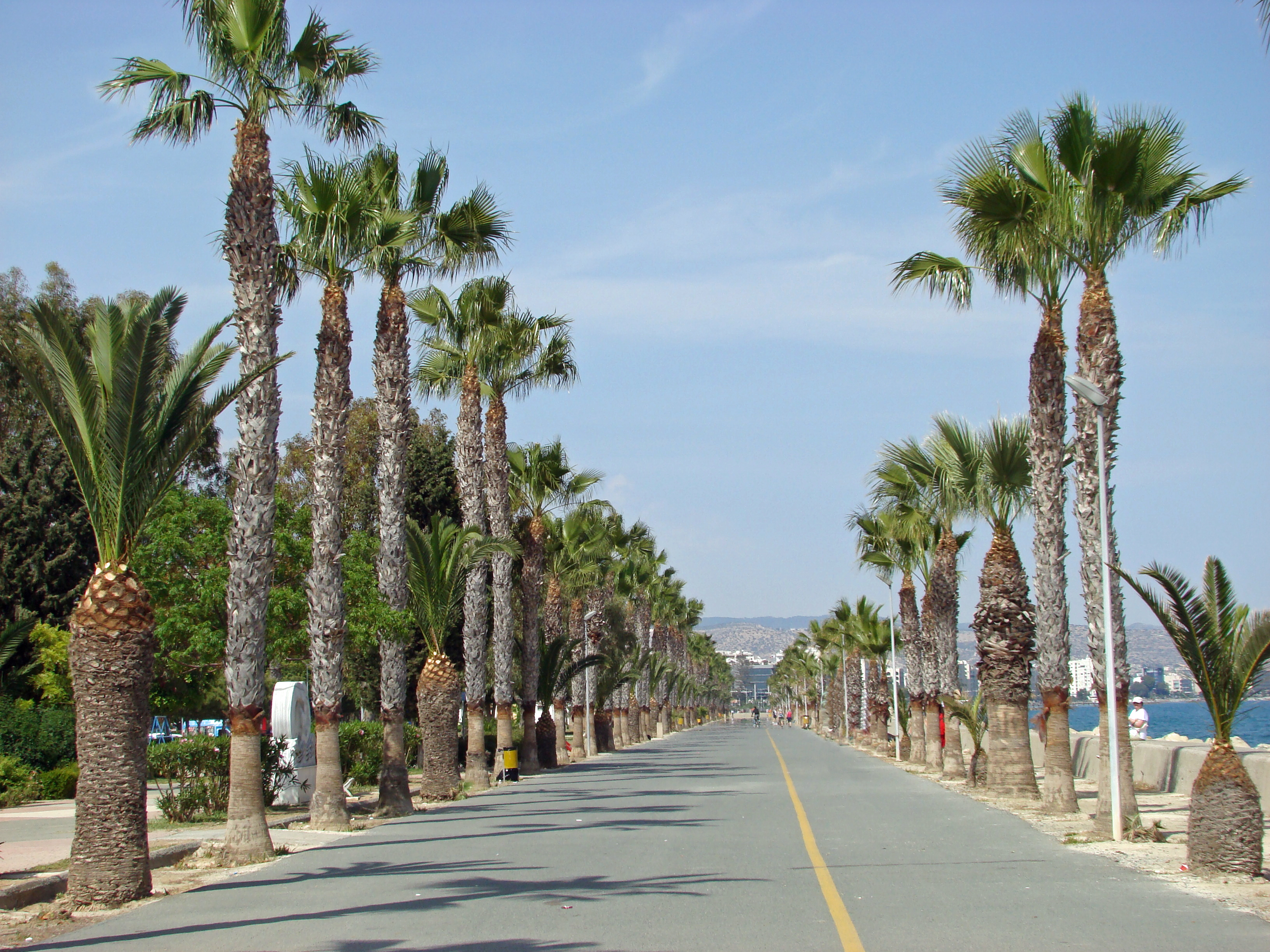
Limassol Molos, Before redevelopment, 2008

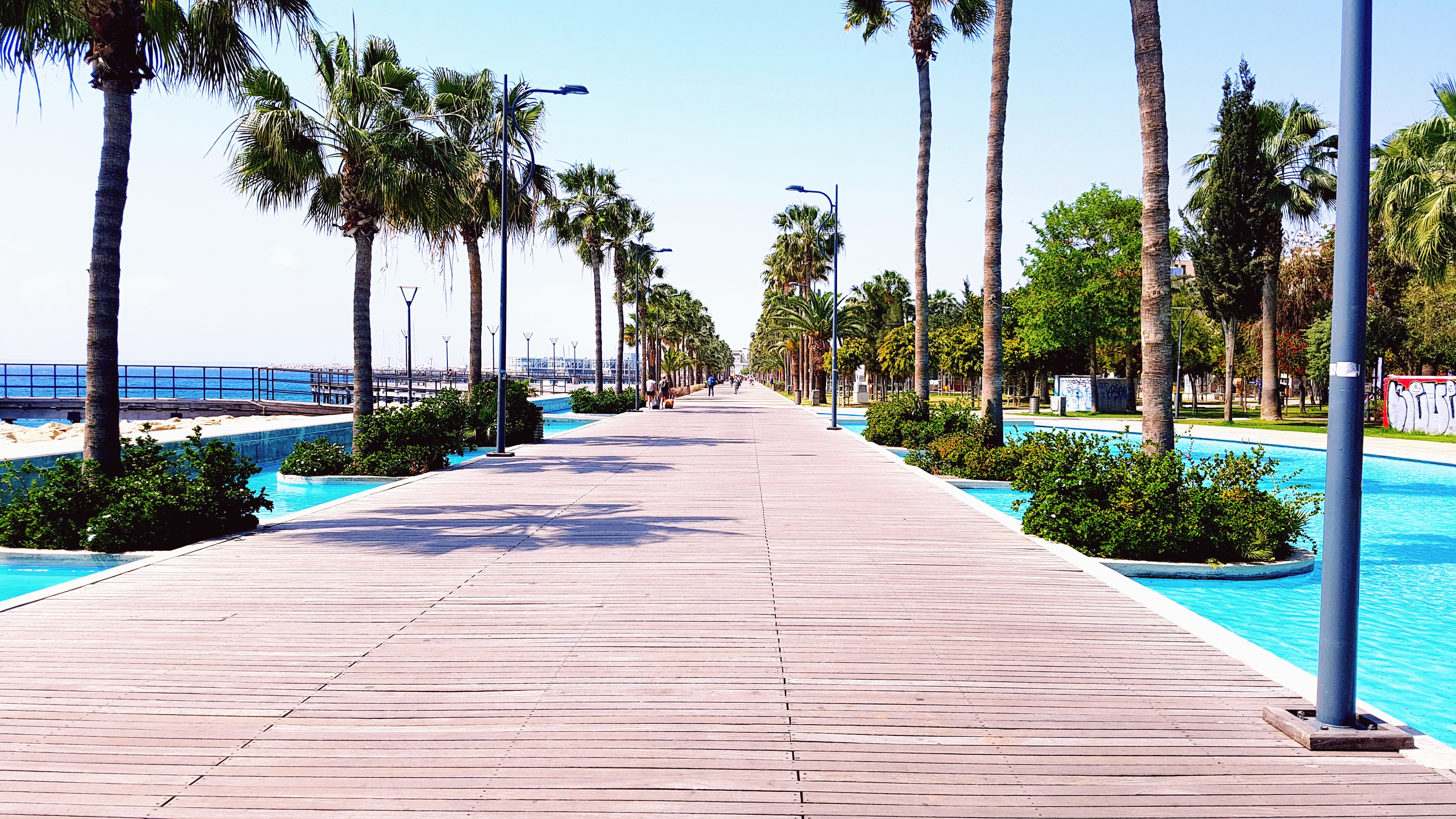
Limassol Molos, After redevelopment, 2018

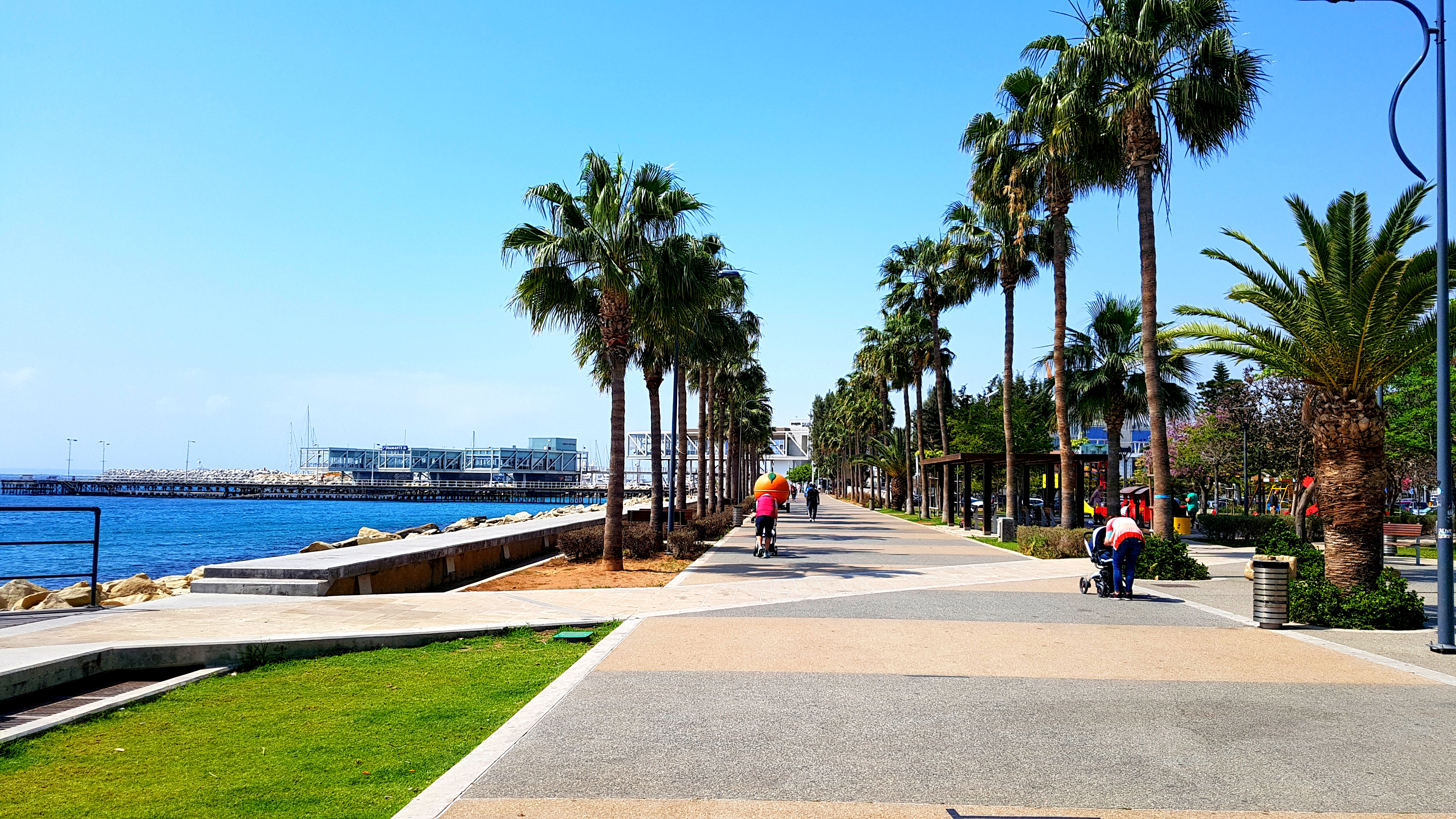
Limassol Molos, After redevelopment, 2018

It is one of the projects which gave the city its lost identity as a seaside town. The redevelopment of the Molos area was completed in 2015, at a cost of €12,000,000, funded by European Regional Development Fund.
