= Georgios Papachatzis =

Greek jurist

Rector Georgios Papachatzis on 3 Oct 1964 at Panteion University doctorate degree awarding ceremony of Jean Lesage.

Georgios Papachatzis (Greek: Γεώργιος Παπαχατζής; 1905–1991), alternately spelled as Giorgos or George Papahatzis or Papachatzis, was a Greek jurist.

== Early life ==
Papachatzis was born in Chalcis in 1905. He studied law at the National and Kapodistrian University of Athens and was awarded a Ph.D. in Law in 1932.

== Career ==
Papachatzis was Professor of Administrative Law at Panteion University from 1943 to 1967 when he was dismissed from the Greek military junta of 1967–74. He was among the prominent Greek Professors of the first period of the Panteion University after its foundation in 1927, that contributed to the university's curriculum. He also served as Rector of the university from 1964 to 1965.

In 1929, he was accepted into the Council of State, upon that institution's establishment, having come second to Michail Stasinopoulos in the entrance examination among about 120 nominations for the ten positions of Auditors of the Council of State. He also served as the President of the Council of State's 2nd Department (1963-1968) and Vice President in 1969.

He served as secretary of the Greek administration in the Dodecanese in 1947. He was vice president emeritus of Parnassos Literary Society.

== Writings ==
Georgios Papachatzis published papers mainly in areas of Social Studies and Administrative Law.

Among his publications is the supposed diary of Paul Amadeus Dienach initially in 1973 and later in 1979 under the title The Valley of the Roses along with various articles on its study.

== Death ==
Papachatzis died in 1991 in Athens.
