= Wine Festival of Cyprus =

Wine Festival held in Limassol, Cyprus

Coordinates: 34.6667°N 33.0333°E

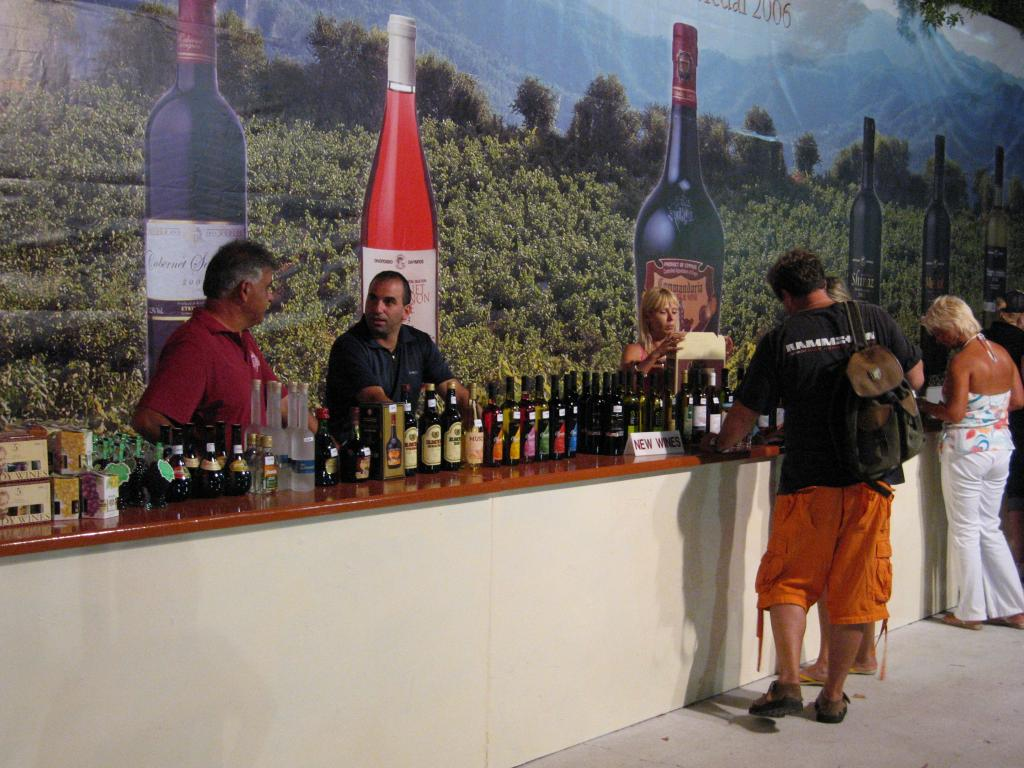
- Stand at the festival, 2006
- Official name: Wine Festival of Cyprus
- Also called: Greek: Γιορτή του Κρασιού, romanized: Giortḗ tou Krasioú
- Significance: Wine festival held annually in Limassol
- Celebrations: Wine making
- 2025 date: 27th September- 5th October 2025
- Duration: approx. 9 days
- Frequency: Annual
- First time: 1961; 65 years ago
- Started by: Limassol Development Association

The Wine Festival of Cyprus (Greek: Γιορτή του Κρασιού, Giortí tou Krasioú) is an annual festival held in late summer, in Limassol, Cyprus, that celebrates wine and winemaking. It is dedicated to the island's winemaking heritage.

The festival was established in 1961 by the Limassol Development Association. Since 1978 it has been organized by the Limassol Municipality and is usually held in the Limassol Public Gardens.

== History and Cultural Roots ==
=== Inception and Evolution ===
Responsibility for the festival passed to the Limassol Chamber of Commerce and Industry in 1966 and to the municipality in 1978. Although the idea of a wine festival had circulated among producers and local organizations for years, concerns over cost and viability delayed its realization. The first event was held after the Association's president, Kleanthis Christoforou, presented a plan supported by the major Cypriot wine companies ETKO, KEO, SODAP, and LOEL, which provided wine free of charge. The Limassol Municipality offered the Public Gardens as the venue, and the Ministry of Trade and Industry contributed financial support. Entertainment was provided by local musicians, artists, and dance groups.

Despite initial doubts about public reception, the first festival exceeded expectations and proved highly successful. Its primary aim was to promote Cypriot wine consumption both domestically and abroad, while also alleviating a wine surplus that had become a concern for producers and the government. At the same time, the event was intended to provide entertainment for Cypriot citizens and foreign visitors.

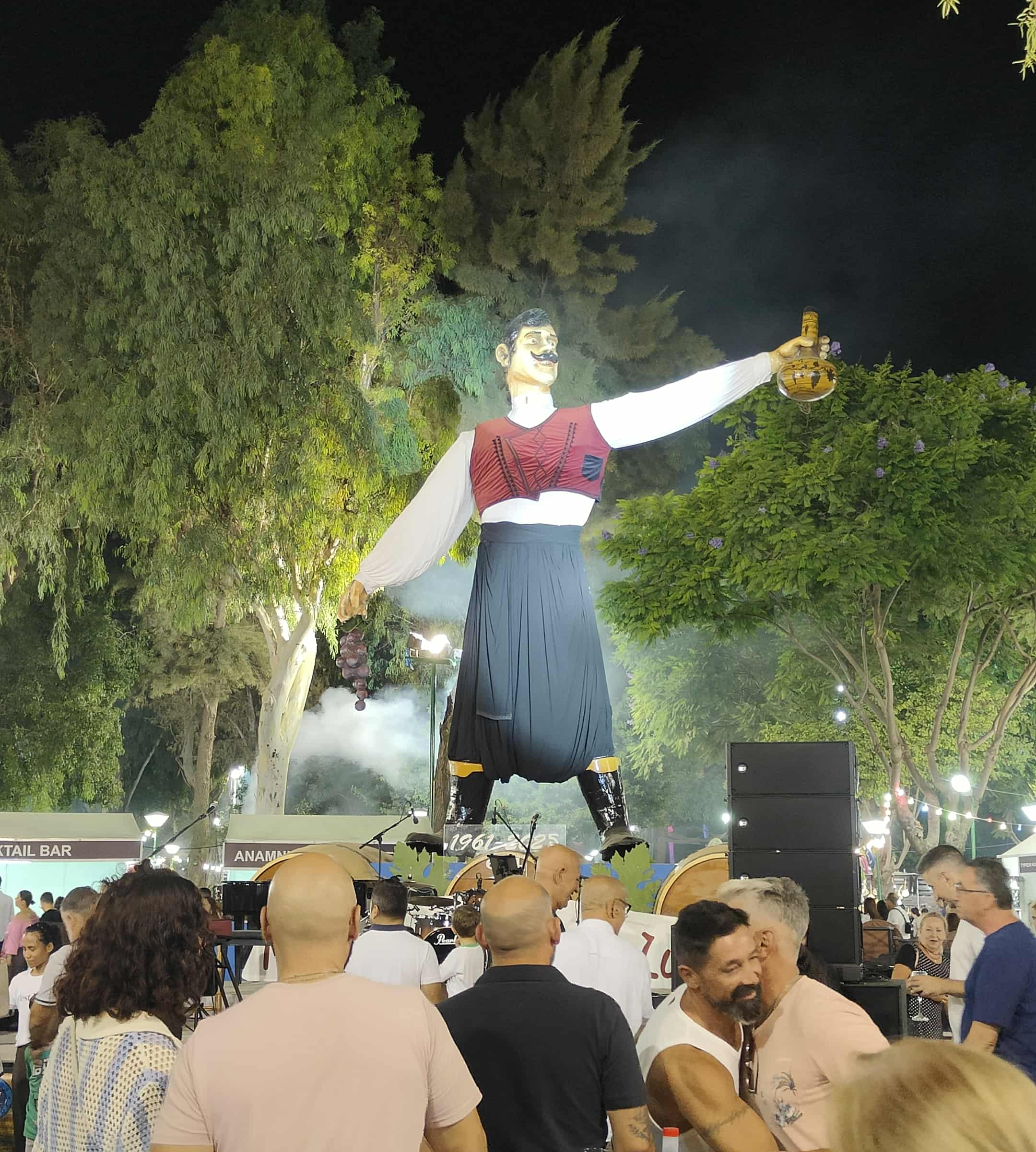
The traditional statue of "vrakas", in one of the entrances of the Limassol Municipal Gardens

One of the most notable decorations was a seven-metre tall figure of a Cypriot vrakas (traditional wide breeches worn in Cyprus and other parts of Greece), representing a traditional vine grower in local dress. The figure, created by artist Giorgos Mavrogenis, was installed opposite the main entrance of the Limassol Public Gardens. It became the emblem of the Wine Festival in 1962 and remains in use today. Beneath the figure is the motto «Πίννε κρασίν να σιής ζωήν» ("Drink wine to live long"), attributed to Michalis Pitsillides (1920–2008, Cypriot writer, playwright, and poet).

Since its inception, the Wine Festival has become an annual institution, attracting thousands of locals and tourists each year to the Limassol Public Gardens.

=== Interruptions ===
The festival was suspended in 1964 due to conflict in the Tylliria region, and again in 1974-1977 following Turkey's invasion of Cyprus in 1974. It resumed in 1978 under municipal stewardship. A further disruption came in 2020 and 2021, when public-health measures connected with the COVID-19 pandemic curtailed the event before it returned to its full format in 2022.

=== Ancient traditions ===
The Wine Festival is presented as a modern continuation of ancient Cypriot traditions linked to the cult of Dionysus, the Greek god of wine. Winemaking on the island is documented from antiquity, and Cypriot wine was traded across the Mediterranean in classical times.

== Venue ==
The festival takes place in the Limassol Public Gardens (also known as the Municipal Gardens), a lush 60,000 m² park established in 1888, located along the seafront in central Limassol. It includes botanical features, playgrounds, an open-air stage, and even the Limassol Zoo.

== Festival Format & Activities ==
The festival runs for approximately nine days in late September and early October. Entry is ticketed, although tastings of the wines presented were historically provided without an additional charge, with costs covered by the municipality.

A range of Cypriot wines, including dry whites, sweet reds, Commandaria, and Zivania, are presented for tasting, and the programme includes workshops and seminars with local winemakers and sommeliers.

Traditional dishes such as souvlaki, halloumi, and loukoumades are also served. Evening entertainment includes folklore dances, choir and musical performances, comedic theater, and grape treading.
