= Panteion University =

University in Athens, Greece

Coordinates: 37.9417°N 23.653°E

Panteion University of Social and Political Sciences
- Πάντειον Πανεπιστήμιο Κοινωνικών και Πολιτικών Επιστημών
- Former name: Panteios School of Political Sciences
- Type: Public higher education institution
- Established: 1927; 99 years ago
- Rector: Christina Koulouri
- Undergraduates: 18,500
- Postgraduates: 1,500
- Doctoral students: 1,000
- Location: Kallithea, Athens, Greece
- Website: www.panteion.gr

The Panteion University of Social and Political Sciences (PUSPS; Greek: Πάντειον Πανεπιστήμιο Κοινωνικών και Πολιτικών Επιστημών, romanized: Pánteion Panepistī́mio Koinōnikṓn kai Politikṓn Epistīmṓn, ΠΠΚΠΕ), usually referred to simply as the Panteion University (Πάντειο Πανεπιστήμιο, Pánteio Panepistī́mio), is a university located in Athens, Greece. Founded in 1927, it is the oldest university of social and political sciences in Greece.

At Panteion University there is a student population of 19,000 students enrolled at graduate and postgraduate level and 360 teaching and administrative staff. The university also offers thirteen postgraduate courses and includes three research institutes, eighteen research centres and four laboratories.

== History ==
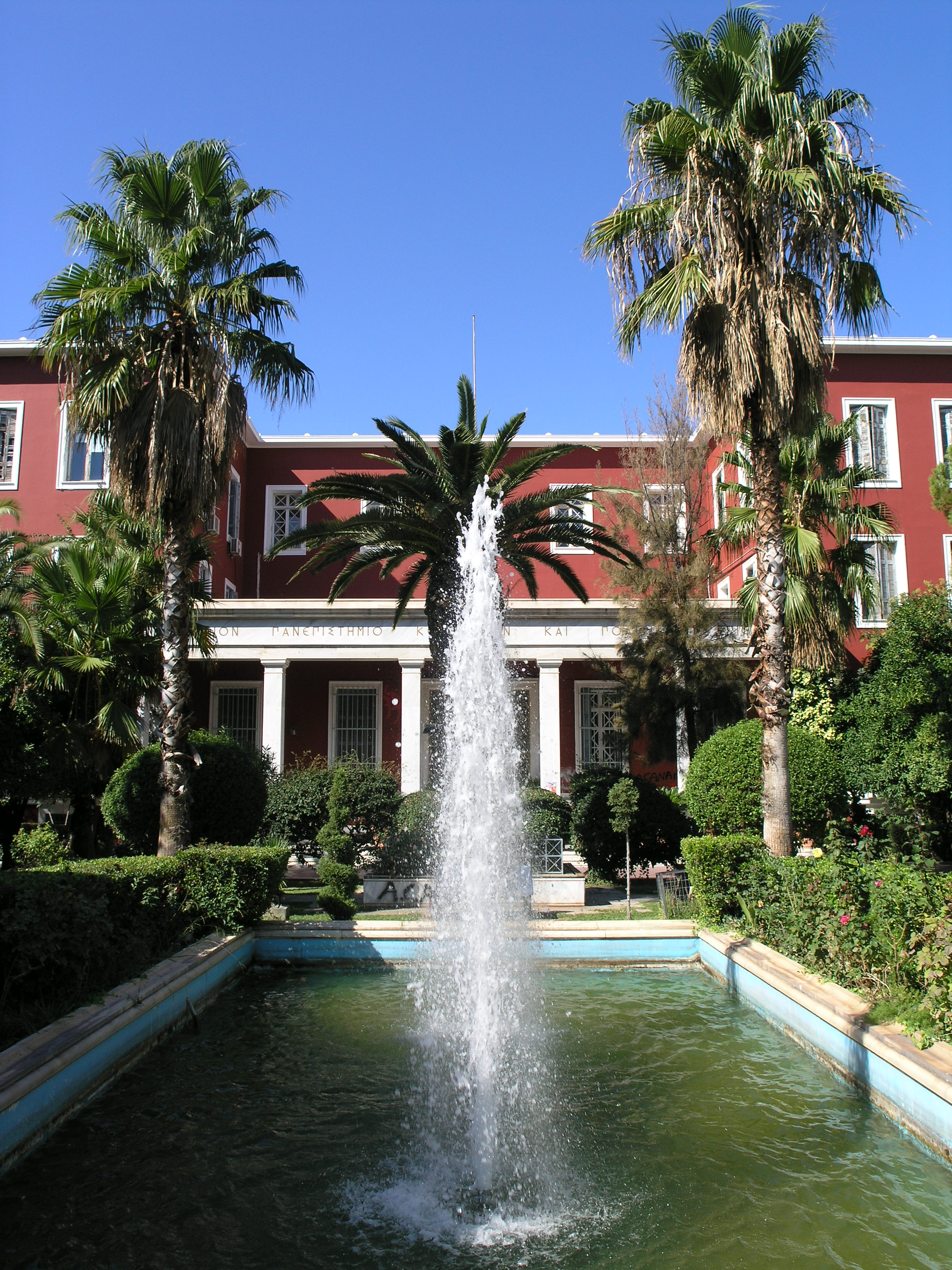
The first, historic building of Panteion University.

The Panteion University has a long history of a creative development linked to the course of higher education and the development of social sciences in Greece.

It was founded in 1927 under the name School of Political Sciences (Σχολή Πολιτικών Επιστημών), due to the envisagement of two persons who had studied at the Free School of Political Sciences in Paris (Sciences Po), Georgios Fragoudes and Alexandros Pantos. Pavlos Kountouriotis, the president of Greece at the time, inaugurated the central building of the university, which functioned for the first time on 18 November 1930, attended by 200 students. Alexandros Pantos bequeathed his fortune to the school, which was republished by the prime minister of Greece, Eleftherios Venizelos, making the institute stable in the academical scene of the country.

In 1931 the school was renamed to Panteios School of Political Sciences (Πάντειος Σχολή Πολιτικών Επιστημών).

At the beginning, the contribution of the minister for national education, George Papandreou, was very important for the school, which consisted of two departments, the Political-Historical and the Social-Economical, while the studies were planned for six semesters. In 1936 the school was recognised as a "public utility of higher education" and in 1937 it was turned into a "legal person of public law". In 1951 the two departments were renamed to the Department of Political Science and Department of Public Administration, respectively, while the course of studies expanded to eight semesters in 1963.

After the reorganization of the Greek educational system in 1983, the Panteios School was divided into three departments: Political Science and International Studies, Public Administration, Sociology. In 1989 the School was renamed to its current name, Panteion University of Social and Political Sciences, and five new departments were created, these of: Communication and Mass Media, Psychology, Social Policy and Social Anthropology, Economic and Regional development, General Department of Law.

In the 1990s, two of the previous departments were split into two: Political Science and International Studies into: a) Political Science and History, b) International and European Studies, and Social Policy and Social Anthropology into: a) Social Policy, b) Social Anthropology. During the same period the campus expanded and improved.

== Schools and academic departments ==
The university today consists of four schools and nine academic departments.

| Schools | Departments |
|---|---|
| School of Social Science (founded 2013) | Department of Sociology (founded 1984); Department of Social Anthropology (founded 2004); Department of Psychology (founded 1989) |
| School of Political Science (founded 2013) | Department of Social Policy (founded 2004); Department of Political Science and History (founded 1997) |
| School of Economy and Public Administration (founded 2013) | Department of Public Administration (founded 1963); Department of Economic and Regional development (founded 1989) |
| School of International Studies, Communication and Culture (founded 2013) | Department of International, European and Area Studies (founded 1997); Department of Communication, Media and Cultural studies (founded 1990) |

== Research ==
Panteion University cooperates with many universities and institutes from 17 European countries, and offers a European MA Degree in Human Rights and Democratisation.

=== Academic Affiliations ===
The university participates in several European Union academic networks such as the Jean Monnet Programme, the Erasmus+ Programme, the EQUAL Community Initiative, Equapol, Tempus, Geopac.

== Academic evaluation ==
In 2016 the external evaluation committee gave Panteion University a positive evaluation.

An external evaluation of all academic departments in Greek universities was conducted by the Hellenic Quality Assurance and Accreditation Agency (HQA).

== University units and services ==
=== Library ===
The Panteion University Library is located at the central building of the university and it covers an area of 1,750 m^{2}, divided into four floors. Its purpose is to provide the academic community with its variety of material. Provided that the university supports education and research, the Library offers automated services, printed and electronic collections, and online services as well.

The library has a reading room and it also operates as a lending library. Its collection covers the wide scientific area of social and political sciences with focus on sociology, history, law and political science, philosophy, psychology, economics, management, literature, information science, social anthropology, criminology, mathematics and accountancy. The collection consists of material written mainly in Greek and other languages such as English, French, German and Spanish.

The connection includes: 70,000 monographs, 547 active subscriptions in a total of 763 journals, more than 10,000 electronic journals, online databases, 15 bibliographic databases in CD-ROM which cover the period 1998–2002, 60 classical music CDs, 85 educational CD-ROMs, 20 maps, 500 VHS and DVDs of classical movies, and 308 slides from the National Gallery of London.

=== Gym ===
Panteion University also has its own gym which is located in Neos Kosmos, near the metro station.

== Notable people ==
Professors

- Panagiotis Kanellopoulos (1902–1986), Professor of Law, philosopher, politician, prime minister of the Hellenic Republic (1945, 1967)
- Andreas Loverdos (1956), Professor of Constitutional Law, politician, Minister for Health and Social Solidarity since 2009
- Christos Rozakis (1941), Professor of International Law, currently the president of the Administrative Tribunal of the Council of Europe
- Konstantinos Simitis (1936–2025), Professor of Commercial Law, politician, prime minister of Greece (1996–2004)
- Alexandros Svolos (1892–1956), Professor of Constitutional Law, member of Parliament
- Michail Stasinopoulos (1903–2002), Professor of Administrative Law, rector of the university (1951–1958), politician, president of the Hellenic Republic (1974–1975)
- Dimitris Tsatsos (1933–2010), Professor of Constitutional Law, member of the European Parliament (1994–2004)
- Konstantinos Tsatsos (1899–1987), Professor of the Philosophy of Law, diplomat, president of the Hellenic Republic (1975–1980)
- Neoklis Sarris (1940–2011), Professor of Sociology of History
- Ioannis Theodorakopoulos (1900–1981), Greek philosopher
- Yannis Smaragdis (1946), film director, screenwriter
- Christos Yannaras (1935), Professor of Philosophy, theologian
- Yiorgos Veltsos (1944), Professor of Communication Theory and Sociology
- Georgios Papachatzis (1905–1991), Professor of Administrative Law (1943–1967), rector of the university (1964–1965)

Notable alumni

- Anna Diamantopoulou (1959), politician, former Minister of Education, former European Commissioner for Employment, Social Affairs and Equal Opportunities
- Vangelis Meimarakis (1953), lawyer and politician, former Minister of National Defence, Speaker of the Hellenic Parliament
- Stamatis Kraounakis (1955), music composer, music producer, lyricist, writer and director.
- Giorgos Katsaros (1934), musician and songwriter
- Yannis Stavrakakis (1970), political theorist
- Sotiris Kovos, automobile designer
- Ioannis Makro (1991), director, actor & Film Olympiad founder and chairman

== Alumni Association "Aristotle" ==
The Alumni Association "Aristotle" of the Panteion University is the oldest alumni association in Greece, founded in 1942 by a group of Panteion alumni, providing a wide variety of benefits to its members. Members' network strives to connect alumni to the university and to each other.

Eligible to register as members are all Panteion alumni, provided they have completed at Panteion University either their undergraduate or graduate studies, or both.

== See also ==
- List of universities in Greece
- List of research institutes in Greece
- Study in Greece – Official portal for studies in Greece (in Greek and English)
- European Higher Education Area
- Hellenic Academic Libraries Link (HEAL-Link)) (in Greek and English)
- Kallipos (e-books Greek academic publishing) (in Greek and English)
- Greek Research and Technology Network (GRNET) (in Greek and English)
- Education in Greece
- Open access in Greece
