= Limassol Zoo =

Zoo in Limassol, Cyprus

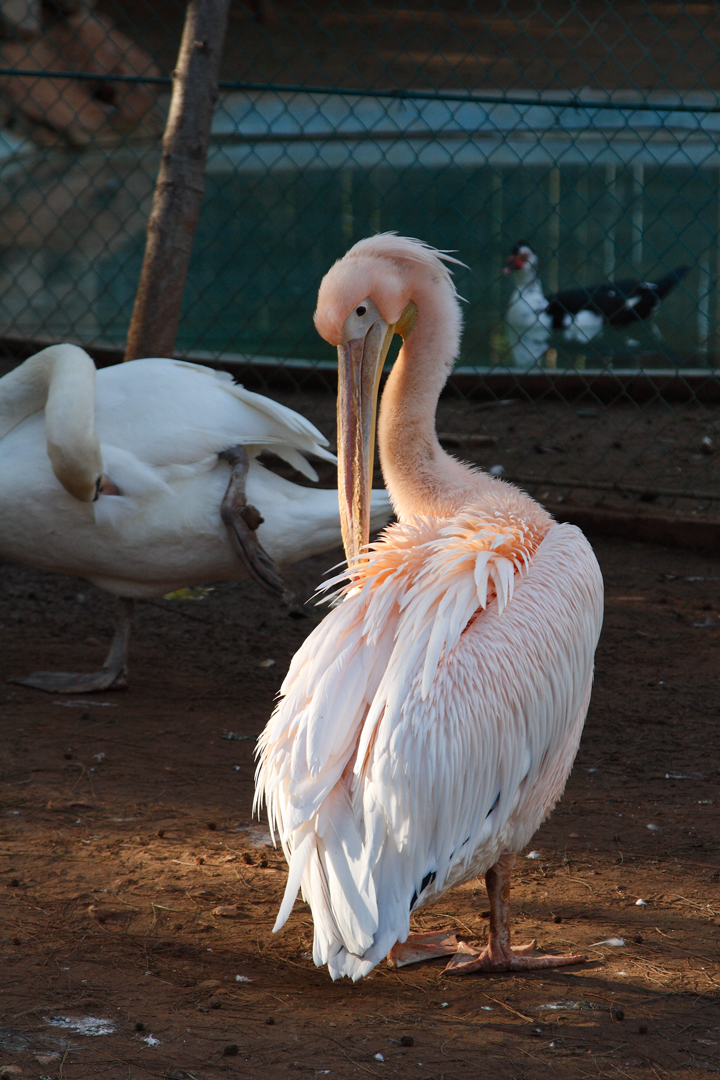
- Pelican at Limassol Zoo
- 34.683254°N 33.055613°E
- Date opened: 1956; 69 years ago
- Location: Vyronos Avenue, Limassol 3105, Cyprus
- Land area: 15 acres (6.1 ha)
- No. of animals: 300
- No. of species: 90
- Website: https://www.limassol.org.cy/

The Limassol Zoo (Greek: Ζωολογικός Κήπος Λεμεσού, romanized: Zōologikós Kḗpos Lemesoú) is located within the Limassol Public Gardens, is a 15 acres (6.1 ha) zoological garden in Limassol, Cyprus. It was founded by Mayor Kostas Partaside in 1956. After substantial renovations, the Limassol Zoo was reopened in 2012.

== See also ==
- List of zoos by country
- Captivity
- Botanical garden
- Captive animal
