= Dimitrios Talaganis =

Greek artist (1945–2021)

Dimitrios Talaganis (Greek: Δημήτριος Ταλαγάνης; 1945 – 15 April 2021) was a Greek artist, architect, poet and urban planner.

== Biography ==
He was born in Tripoli, Greece, in 1945 and lived in Arcadia during his childhood; he then moved to Athens, where he lived until 1964. He studied on a scholarship at the Moscow Architectural Institute and in 1971, received a diploma and a master's degree in architecture. He also received the first prize for the design of the New Lenin Museum. This design was exhibited for a year at the Exhibition of Achievements of Soviet Technology and Science, where it won the gold medal. In 1970 he was also awarded at the OSAKA EXPO 1970 World Exhibition for the design of a city of 40,000 inhabitants. In 1971, he carried out a study of the exploitation of the Falirikos Bay, where he proposed the construction of the New Athenian Theatre.

In 1971, he also began to paint. His first painting exhibition was at the salon d'automne of the Grand Palais des Champs Élysées in Paris in 1973. This work was inspired by Giorgos Seferis. He collaborated with the French writer and director Jacques Lacarrière to stage the play Romiosyne by Yannis Ritsos. There was also an exhibition of his works in 1974 at the Foyer Royal de l'Odéon. In August 1974, he returned to Greece, where he continued to work as an architect. He also began to exhibit his works in various exhibitions in Greece. In 1987, he exhibited his works at the Tokyo Metropolitan Museum.

In 1998, he contested the mayoralty of Tripoli, when he was elected deputy mayor of culture.

== Death ==
Talaganis died from COVID-19 on 15 April 2021, aged 76, at a hospital in Athens, where he was hospitalized for a month during the COVID-19 pandemic in Greece.
