= Youssef Tabti =

French artist

Youssef Tabti is a French conceptual artist based in Hamburg, Germany. His work includes installation, photography, video, sound, text and performance. Drawing on research, documentation and archival methods, his projects address social and political questions, including migration, identity, prejudice, colonial history and the ways people experience urban environments.

== Biography ==
Tabti was born in Paris in 1968 and grew up France. His mother is French and his father came from Algeria. He studied art history in Paris and began producing interdisciplinary works in the early 1990s. He has lived and worked in Hamburg since 1996, alongside periods of work and residence in other cities.

== Artistic practice ==
Tabti works across different media, choosing the forms and materials best suited to each project. His installations have combined photography, video, sound, text and graphic works, often developed through research and collaboration. Recurring concerns include the relationship between language and identity, the perception of cultural difference, migration, and the political implications of historical narratives.

In the video installation Muezzin (2007), Tabti juxtaposed a man reciting Islamic prayers in Arabic with a deaf German journalist discussing Islam in sign language. The work explored the ways unfamiliar languages, religious signs and media representations can shape perceptions of cultural difference. In an interview with Die Tageszeitung in 2009, Tabti discussed the controversy surrounding the work and his intention to encourage viewers to reflect on their own assumptions and prejudices.

Tabti's long-term project *Psychogeographic Exploration* has been developed in different forms and urban contexts, adapting its methods to the specific social, cultural and geographical conditions of each location. Beginning in Bratislava in 2015 with *Psychogeographic Junction*, presented at Kunsthalle LAB, the project continued in Istanbul with *Başakşehir – Psychogeographic Exploration* (2015–2017), developed in collaboration with students from Mimar Sinan Fine Arts University. In Bratislava, Tabti worked with local residents to explore the Petržalka district through subjective walks, sound recordings, photography and visual mapping.

In 2018, the project took a collaborative form in Beirut, where Tabti worked with Lebanese architect and urbanist Rani Al Rajji. Seven participants independently explored the Bourj Hammoud neighbourhood, translating their experiences into texts, short videos and sound collages, which Tabti brought together in an installation presented at Zoukak Theatre during the *Sidewalks* performance festival.

The project continued in Sinop, Turkey, where Tabti developed a psychogeographic walk as part of Sinopale in 2024, led as a participatory exploration of the city.

Other projects have addressed migration and colonial history. Greetings from Lampedusa responded to the arrival of migrants on the Italian island, while Colonial His-Story examined European colonialism in Africa through a series of works relating to individual countries and their histories.

== Selected exhibitions and projects ==
- 2007 – Nightcomers, 10th Istanbul Biennial, Istanbul, Turkey.
- 2008 – Wir nennen es Hamburg, Kunstverein Hamburg, Germany.
- 2009 – La Force de l’Art 02, Grand Palais, Paris, France.
- 2010 – Manifesta 8, parallel programme, Murcia, Spain.
- 2010 – Other Worlds, Siemens Sanat, Istanbul, Turkey.
- 2013 – X-Border Biennial, Luleå, Rovaniemi and Severomorsk.
- 2014 – Dissonant Archives, OSLO10, Basel, Switzerland.
- 2015 – Psychogeographic Junction, Kunsthalle LAB, Bratislava, Slovakia.
- 2017 – 3rd Berliner Herbstsalon, Maxim Gorki Theater, Berlin, Germany.
- 2018 – Project at the Goethe-Institut, Beirut, Lebanon.
- 2018 – Presentation at Hamburger Bahnhof – Museum für Gegenwart, Berlin, Germany.
- 2024 – Projects presented in connection with the Emily Harvey Foundation, New York and Venice.
- 2026 – Marcel Duchamp Reloaded: Chess, Performance, and Conceptual Play, Emily Harvey Foundation, New York, United States.
- 2026 – Vizioen en geboorte – Hommage an Hendrik Cramer (1884–1944), KZ-Gedenkstätte Neuengamme, Hamburg, Germany.

== Recent projects ==
=== Marcel Duchamp and chess ===
In May 2026, Tabti presented Marcel Duchamp Reloaded: Chess, Performance, and Conceptual Play at the Emily Harvey Foundation in New York. The exhibition ran from 8 to 13 May 2026, with an opening reception on 8 May at 6:30 pm. The project took as its historical point of departure the chess game between Marcel Duchamp and Frank Marshall at the 1930 Chess Olympiad in Hamburg, which ended in a draw. Tabti revisited this encounter through a contemporary artistic project combining chess, performance and conceptual play.

=== Hendrik Cramer ===
In 2026, Tabti presented Vizioen en geboorte – Hommage an Hendrik Cramer (1884–1944) at the Neuengamme Concentration Camp Memorial in Hamburg. The installation focused on the Dutch writer and avant-garde artist Hendrik Cramer, who was a member of the literary and artistic group Le Grand Jeu and died at Neuengamme in 1944.

Developed through historical research, the installation brought together sculptural elements, rotating mirrors, light, plants, photographs, drawings and rare publications from the 1930s. The work sought to make Cramer's life and creative activity visible beyond the historical record of his death. In an interview with SZENE HAMBURG, Tabti discussed the development of the installation, his research into Cramer and the challenges of presenting contemporary art at a concentration camp memorial site.

== Awards and residencies ==
- 1995 – Château de la Napoule, Henry Clews Franco-American Foundation, France.
- 2008 – Künstlerhaus Lauenburg, Germany.
- 2010 – Altona Art Prize, Hamburg, Germany.
- 2013 – ZK/U – Center for Art and Urbanistics, Berlin, Germany.
- 2013 – Stiftung Künstlerdorf Schöppingen, Germany.
- 2015 – Embassy of Foreign Artists, Geneva, Switzerland.
- 2015–2017 – Kulturakademie Tarabya, Istanbul, Turkey.
- 2020 – Working grant for visual artists, Free and Hanseatic City of Hamburg, Germany.
- 2021 – mare-Künstlerhaus, Roger Willemsen Stiftung, Wentorf, Germany.
- 2024 – Fellowship, Stiftung Kunstfonds, Germany.
- 2027 - Fellowship, Das Deutsche Studienzentrum in Venedig.
