= Christodoulos Sozos =

Cypriot mayor (1872–1912)

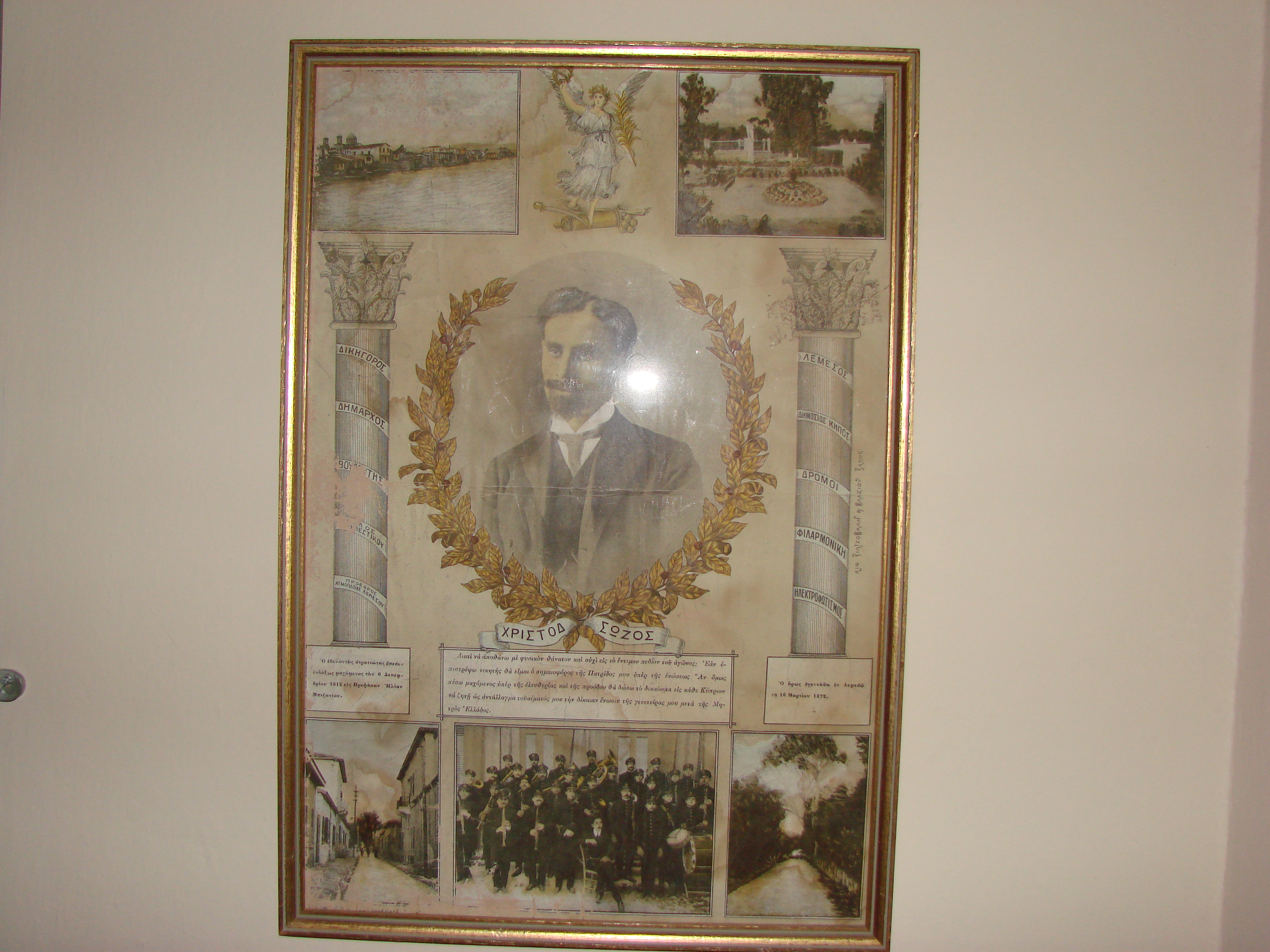
- A poster honoring Sozos.

4th Mayor of Limassol
- In office 1908 – 6 December 1912
- Constituency: Limassol–Paphos

Personal details
- Born: 10 March 1872 Limassol, Cyprus
- Died: 6 December 1912 (aged 40) Manoliasa, Epirus
- Spouse: Ermioni Sozou
- Children: Zinon Sozos

Christodoulos Sozos (Greek: Χριστόδουλος Σώζος; 10 March 1872 in Limassol – 6 December 1912 in Manoliasa, Epirus) was a Greek Cypriot politician and lawyer. He served as a member of the Cypriot Legislative Council (1901–1911), mayor of Limassol (1908–1912) and Limassol–Paphos MP (1908–1912). On 7 November 1912, he voluntarily enlisted in Greek army as private which at the time was fighting in the First Balkan War. He was killed in action on 6 December. His prewar activism on behalf of the cause of Enosis and the circumstances surrounding his death made him one of the most important figures of Greek Cypriot nationalism.

== Early life ==
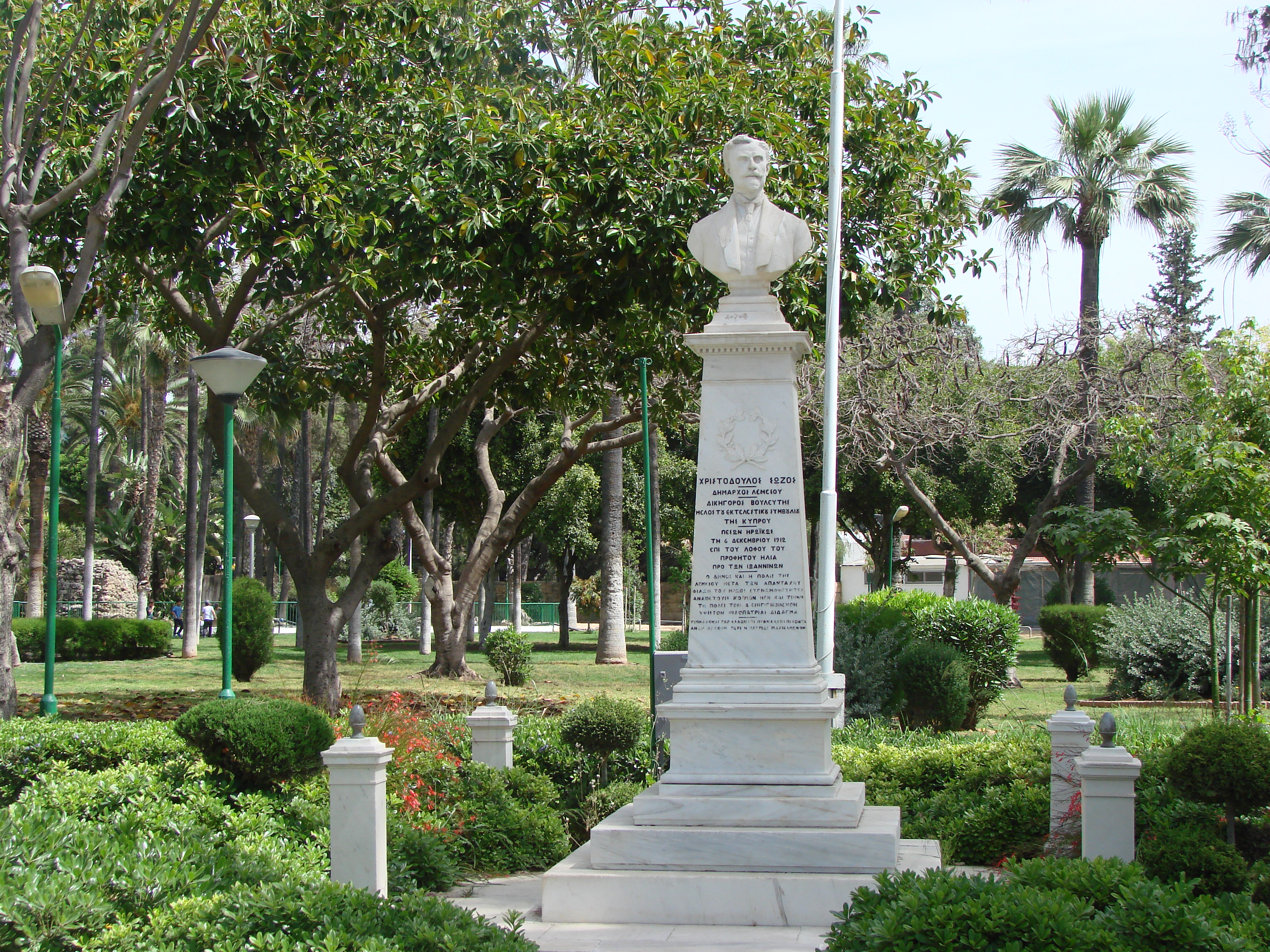
A statue of Sozos in the Limassol Public Gardens.

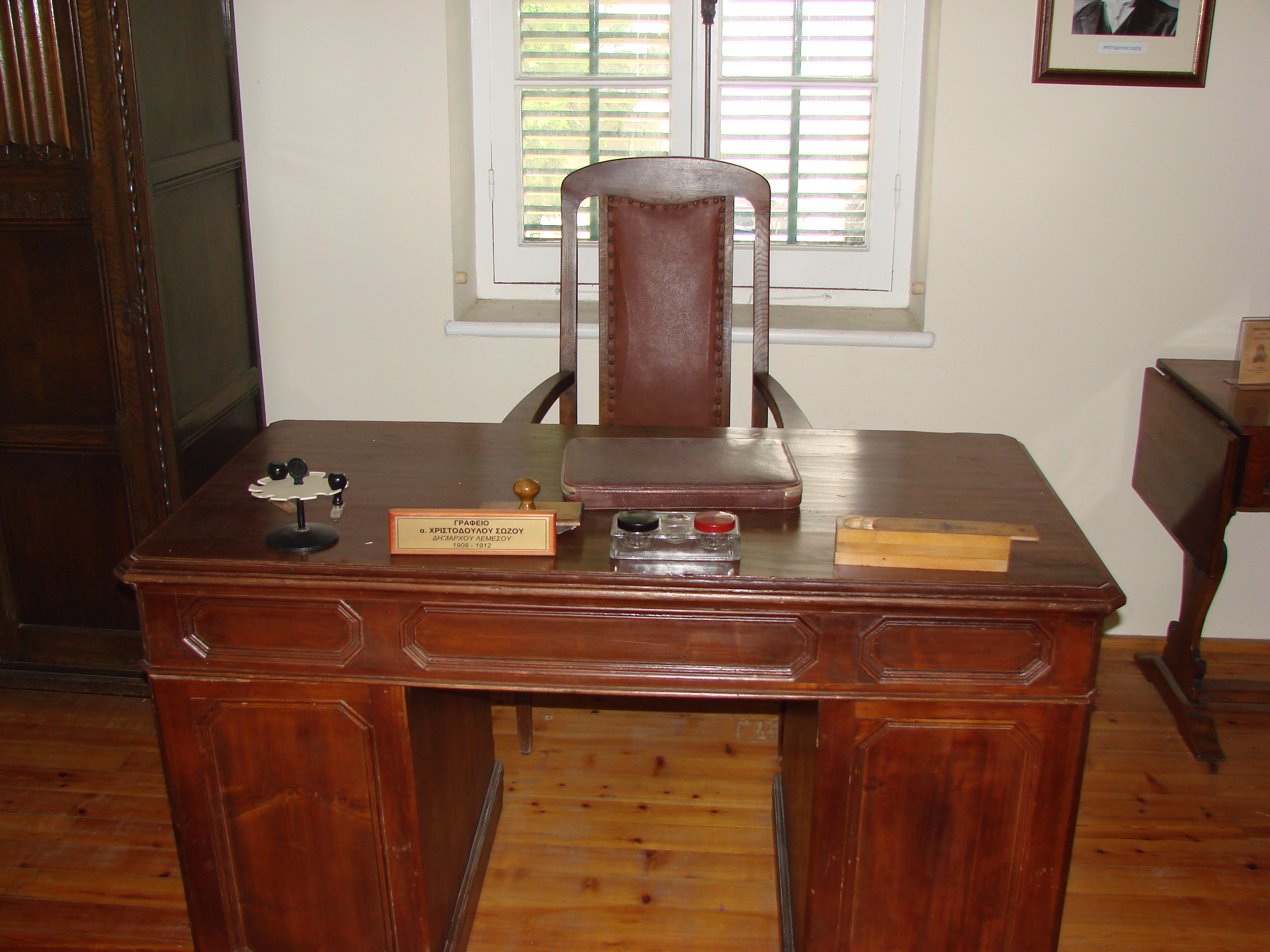
Sozos' office.

Christodoulos Sozos was born in Limassol on 10 March 1872. His father and grandfather had fought as volunteers in the Cretan Revolt (1866–1869) and the Greek War of Independence respectively. He studied law at the National and Kapodistrian University of Athens and worked as a lawyer before the beginning of his political career. He served as member of the Cypriot Legislative Council from 1901 until 1911, and represented Limassol–Paphos constituency as an MP during the same period. In April 1903, he exploited the absence of a single Turkish Cypriot member of the council to pass a resolution which declared that the people of Cyprus aspired to reunite with their motherland (Greece). He also served as the mayor of Limassol from 1908 until his death, his most notable achievements being the erection of the city's first public garden as well as the electrification of the street lighting, the first such occasion in Cyprus. Upon returning from his visit to Great Britain in June 1912, he became convinced that the only way for the Enosis between Cyprus and Greece was an intermediate step of autonomous rule. His stance drew sharp criticism from his political rival Nikolaos Katalanos who described the supporters of autonomy as madmen and traitors.

== Balkan War ==
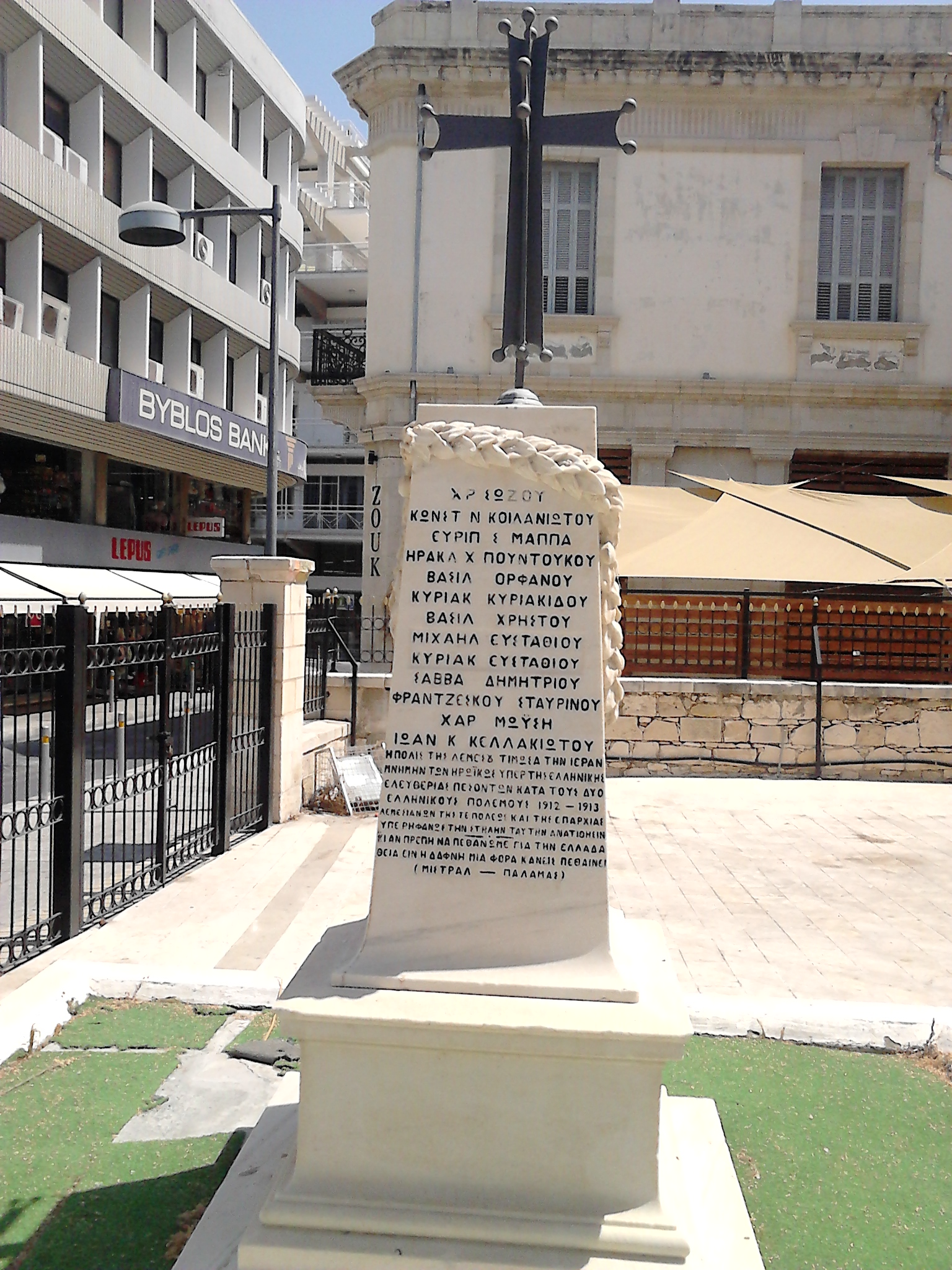
Limassol Balkan Wars Memorial. Sozos' name is inscribed at the top.

At the outbreak of the First Balkan War, Cyprus was nominally a part of the Ottoman Empire, while in fact being administered by the British Empire as agreed in the Cyprus Convention of 1878. On 17 October 1912, Sozos departed from Limassol as part of a small unit of the Cypriot Red Cross which headed to Athens in order to assist the Greek army which at the time fought against the Ottomans. His wife Ermioni Sozou, his 4-year-old son Zinon and 7 sisters were not informed about his decision as he feared that they would not allow him to leave. The ship made stops at Alexandria and Patras before arriving to its final destination on 23 October. On 7 November, he took part in an hour long official meeting with the Greek prime minister Eleutherios Venizelos. Venizelos became emotional and eventually gave in to his pleas, allowing him and Larnaca MP Evaggelos Hajioannou to enlist in the 1st Infantry Regiment of the 2nd Infantry Division as privates.

On 1 November his unit reached Thessaloniki, on 13 November he was dispatched to Agioi Saranta. He fought at Delvino before taking part in the Battle of Bizani. On 6 December, Sozos was killed in action on the Profitis Ilias height, Manoliasa, outside Bizani. Despite multiple search missions his body was never recovered.

News of his death reached Cyprus in the second half of December. His wife Ermioni received hundreds of telegrams offering condolences from both Cyprus and abroad, among them was one from the British High Commissioner to Cyprus Hamilton Goold-Adams. Greek schools and courts suspended their activities, a court in Nicosia also raised a flag in honor of Sozos thus breaking the law as Britain maintained a neutral stance in the conflict. Ironically Nikolaos Katalanos delivered a speech during Sozos' mnemosynon where he described him as a "hyperpatriot". Mnemosyna were also held in dozens of villages across Cyprus, as well as in Cypriot communities in Athens, Egypt and Sudan. Greek Cypriot newspapers were swept with nationalist fervor comparing Sozos with Pavlos Melas. Goold-Adams and his successor as British High Commissioner to Cyprus John Eugene Clauson, praised Sozos in their last and first addresses respectively.

A photo of Sozos was placed in the Hellenic Parliament. Streets were named after Sozos in Limassol and Ioannina, there are busts honoring Sozos in Limassol, Ioannina and Thessaloniki. Sozos' death left a lasting mark on the Enosis movement, being one of its most important events before the 1931 Cyprus revolt. The Rectory Building of the Cyprus University of Technology is named after Sozos.
