= Anexartisias Street =

Shopping street in Limassol, Cyprus

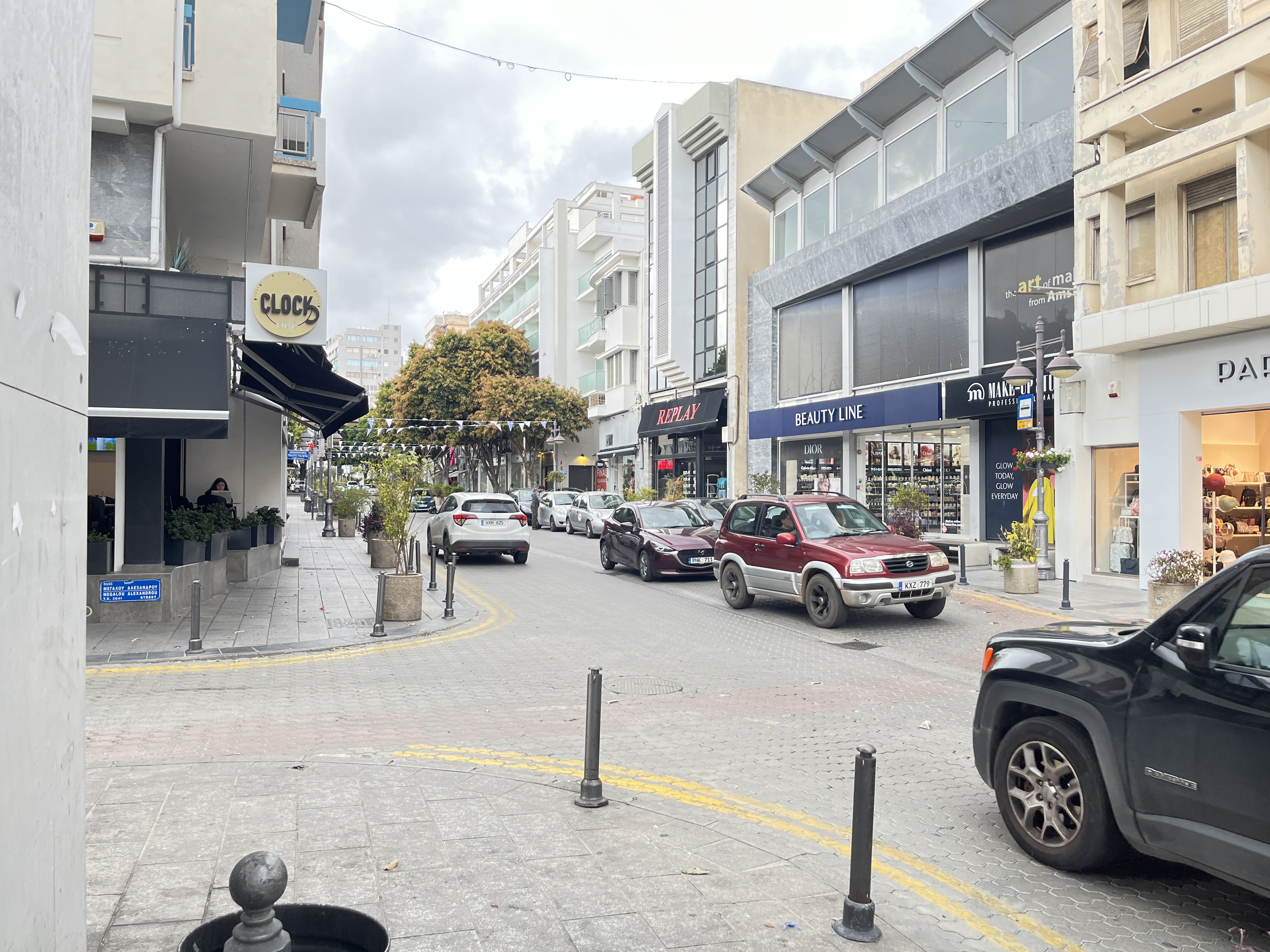
- Anexartisias Street
- Native name: Ανεξαρτησίας
- Former name(s): Macedonias; Μακεδονίας
- Part of: Limassol Municipality
- Length: 730 metres (0.45 miles)
- Location: Limassol, Cyprus
- Postal code: 3040
- Coordinates: 34.6771784°N 33.0450967°E

Construction
- Completion: 1917

Other
- Known for: Shopping & Leisure

Anexartisias Street (Greek: Οδός Ανεξαρτησίας, romanized: Odós Anexartisías, lit. 'Independence street') is located in the Old Town of Limassol and is considered the main shopping street of the city, surpassing Makariou Avenue. It hosts many retail stores as well as Gregori Afxentiou Square, where events, including the Limassol Carnival, are held.

== History ==
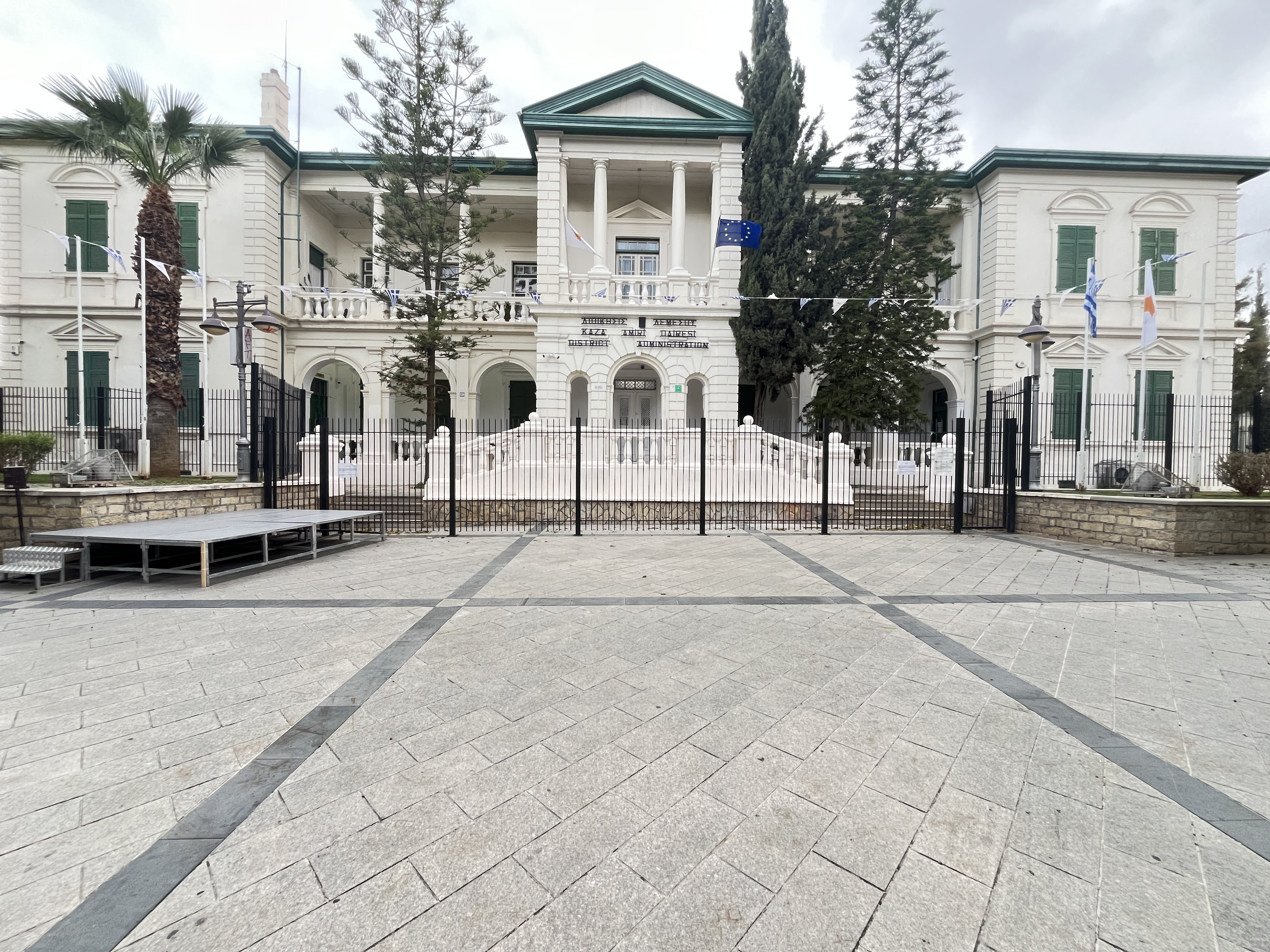
The Limassol District Administration building on Gregori Afxentiou Sq

The street first showed signs of growth in 1923. The Independence of The Republic of Cyprus in 1960 was a significant event in the history of Cyprus and inspired the street to be named after it: Anexartisias (Greek: Ανεξαρτησίας, romanized: Anexartisías, lit. 'Independence').

In its early years of growth, the Limassol Hospital (now the District Administration Building) was built when the street wasn't yet named. Around 1930–1940, the street was referred to as "Macedonias Street".

== Features ==
The main attractions are the multitude of shops and cafes along the street, which have made it well known to residents and visitors alike. Besides retail stores, the street also hosts the District Office, which participates in decorating the street and surrounding areas for various occasions, such as Christmas.

== Controversies and incidents ==
=== Incidents ===
==== Collapsed roof, February 2022 ====
On Sunday, February 20, 2022, the roof of a building collapsed during renovations due to poor concrete stability testing. Pedestrians and vehicles were in the vicinity, but there were no injuries or damages to vehicles. The building was owned by a local church administration.

=== Controversies ===
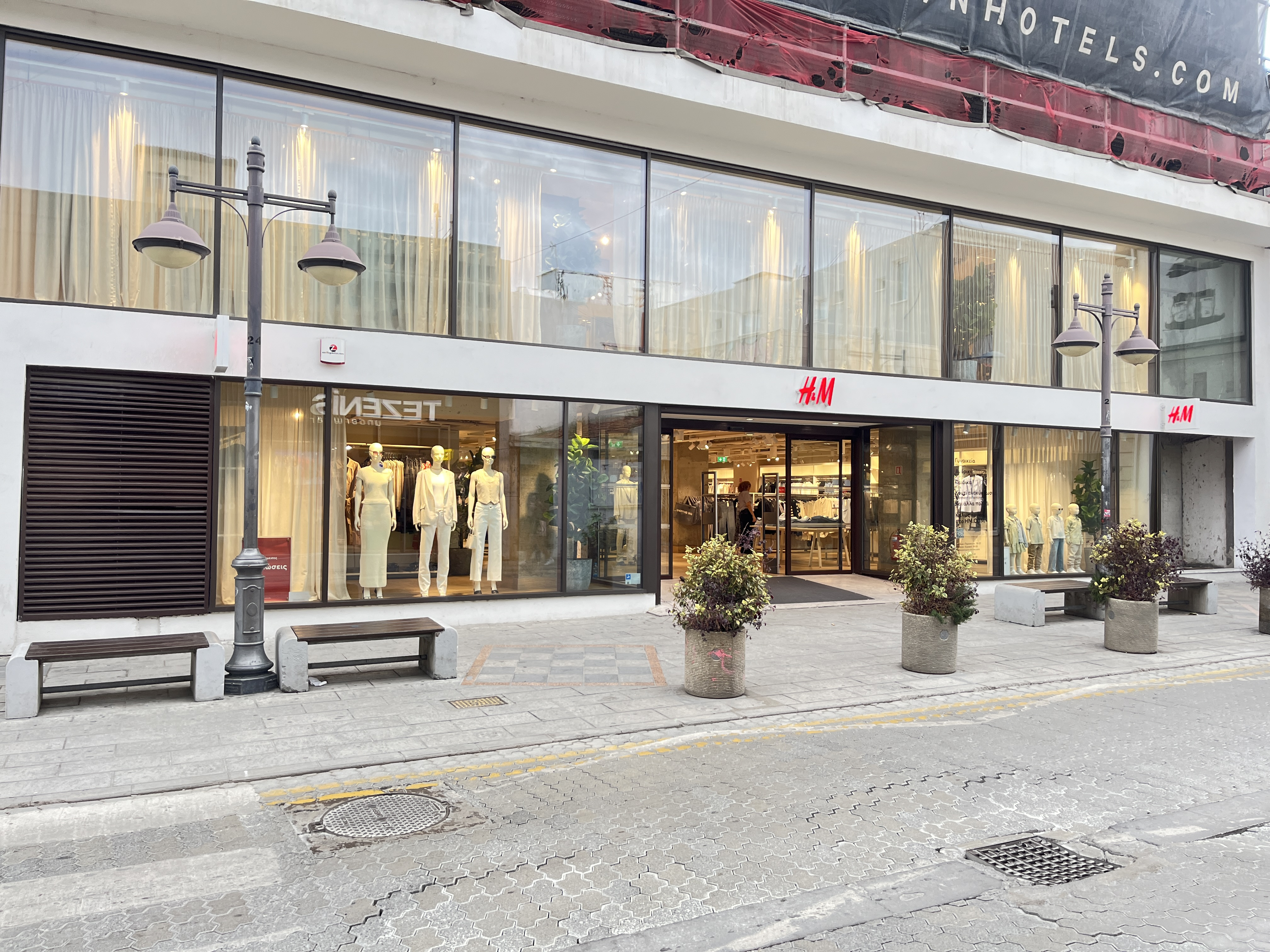
The H&M store on the street

==== H&M opening ====
In February 2021, the Swedish brand H&M announced that they were opening a new branch on the street. It was scheduled to open in the summer of that year. The opening was later postponed to November 18, 2021, and it finally opened on March 3, 2022. The 8-month delay upset many shoppers, and once it opened, there was criticism regarding the "unfinished" state of the building despite the prolonged delay.

== Transportation ==
EMEL 4 5 7 32 ANEXARTISIAS - DISTRICT OFFICE

The street is a two-lane road, mainly connected by Gladstonos Street (a dual carriageway) and 28th October Avenue. It also connects to many smaller neighborhoods and roads.

== See also ==
- Limassol District
- List of shopping streets and districts by city
- List of shopping malls in Cyprus
- Cyprus
