= Makariou Avenue =

Makariou Avenue or Makarios Avenue, or more formally Archbishop Makarios III Avenue, may refer to:

- Makariou Avenue, Nicosia
- Makariou Avenue, Limassol
- Makariou Avenue, Paphos
- Makariou Avenue, Larnaca
