= Makariou Avenue, Limassol =

Shopping street in Limassol

Archbishop Makarios C΄ Avenue
- Makariou Avenue
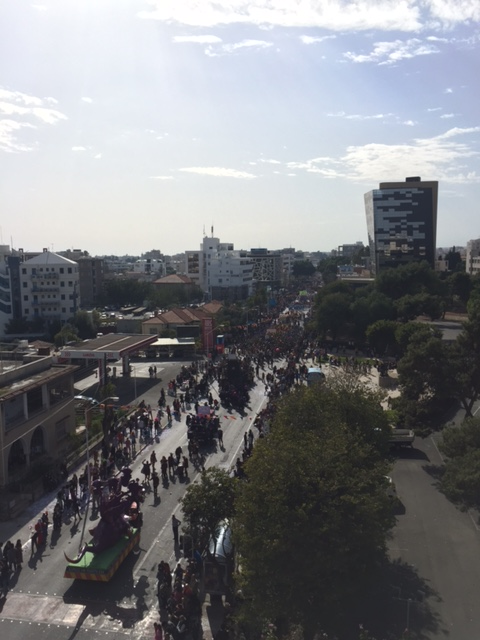
- The Limassol Carnival in Makariou Avenue
- Interactive map of Archbishop Makarios C΄ Avenue
- Native name: Λεωφόρος Αρχιεπισκόπου Μακαρίου Γ΄ (Greek)
- Part of: Limassol Municipality
- Length: ~7 kilometres (4.3 miles)
- Location: Limassol, Cyprus
- Coordinates: 34.684398°N 33.031522°E

Other
- Known for: Shopping & Leisure

Makariou Avenue (Greek: Λεωφόρος Αρχιεπισκόπου Μακαρίου Γ’, romanized: Leophóros Arkhiepiskópou Makaríou G’, lit. 'Archbishop Makarios C΄ Avenue') is one of the busiest shopping streets in Limassol, Cyprus. It hosts many retail stores, offices, towers and schools. Events held on the road include the Limassol Carnival, 25 March Parade and 28 October Parade.

== Features ==
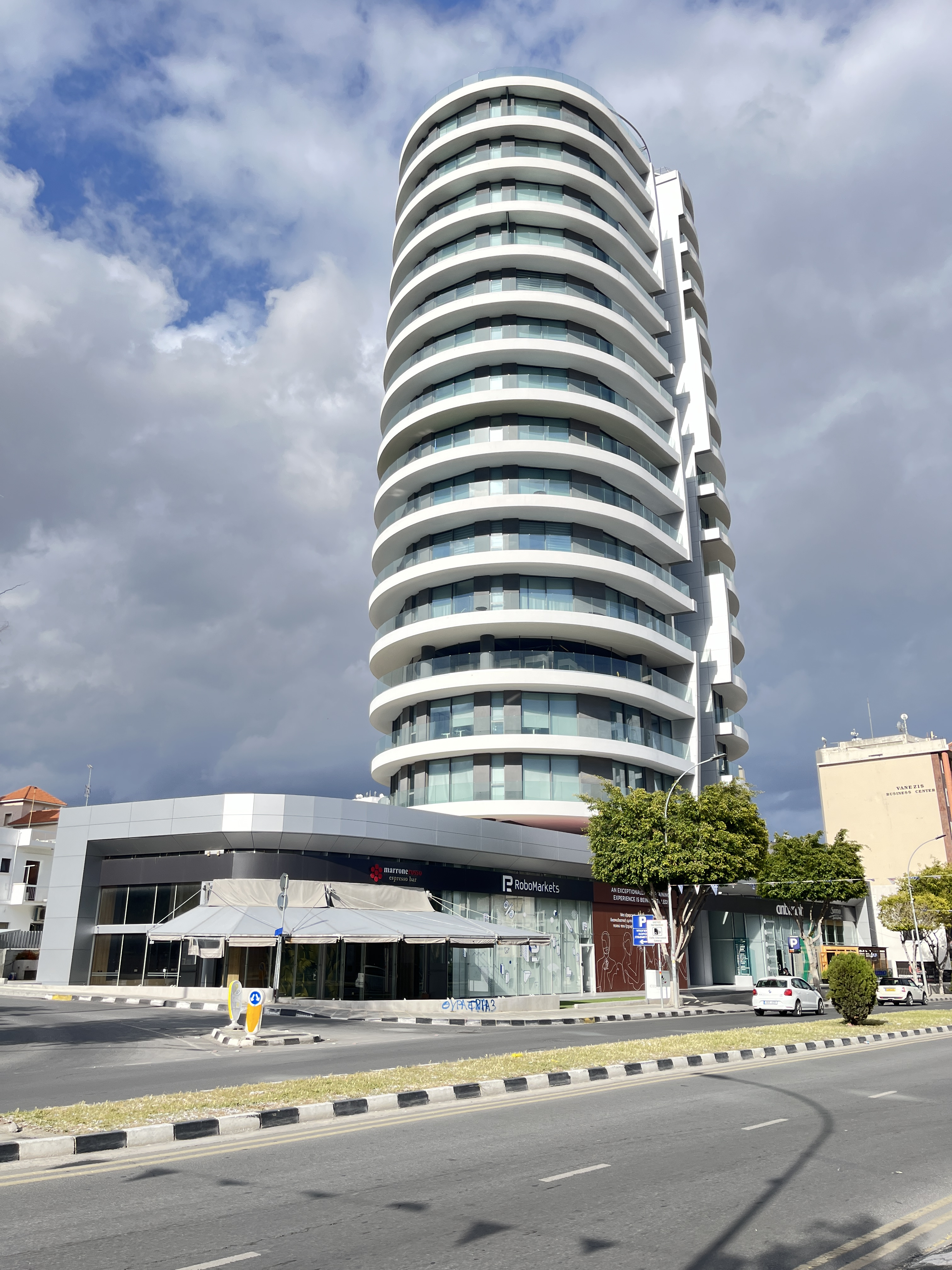
The Cedar Oasis tower

The large number of shops located on the street made it so well known to city residents. Many high-rise buildings are located on the street, including "Avenue 15", a commercial centre, "Safe Bulkers Tower", a tower without corners (see image) and "Cedar Oasis", a tall mixed-use high-rise building. In recent years there has been a huge increase in property construction on the avenue, which have positively impacted the economy of Cyprus.

Although Makariou Avenue covers a huge distance, Anexartisias Street is considered the main shopping street of the city. Despite that, Makariou has a larger number of office buildings which makes it much more influential.

The avenue is no stranger to big events, and is the location for many parades held in the city.

Laniteio Lyceum, the oldest high-school in the city, is located on the street.

== History ==
Although to the avenue's recent growth, the avenue was unrecognisable a couple decade ago. The street acted as a "border" for the city, as it did not extend north of the road. Beginning in the 1950s, the city began expanding northwards, and so the area around the road also began transforming into today's image. Traffic saw an increase when the Laniteio Lyceum relocated to the street, after the school's previous building was unable to house the volume of students enrolling.

It is named after the first President of Cyprus, Archbishop Makarios III.

== See also ==
- Laniteio Lyceum
- Limassol District
- List of shopping streets and districts by city
- List of shopping malls in Cyprus
- Cyprus
