= Limassol Carnival Festival =

Annual carnival event held in Limassol, Cyprus

Limassol Carnival
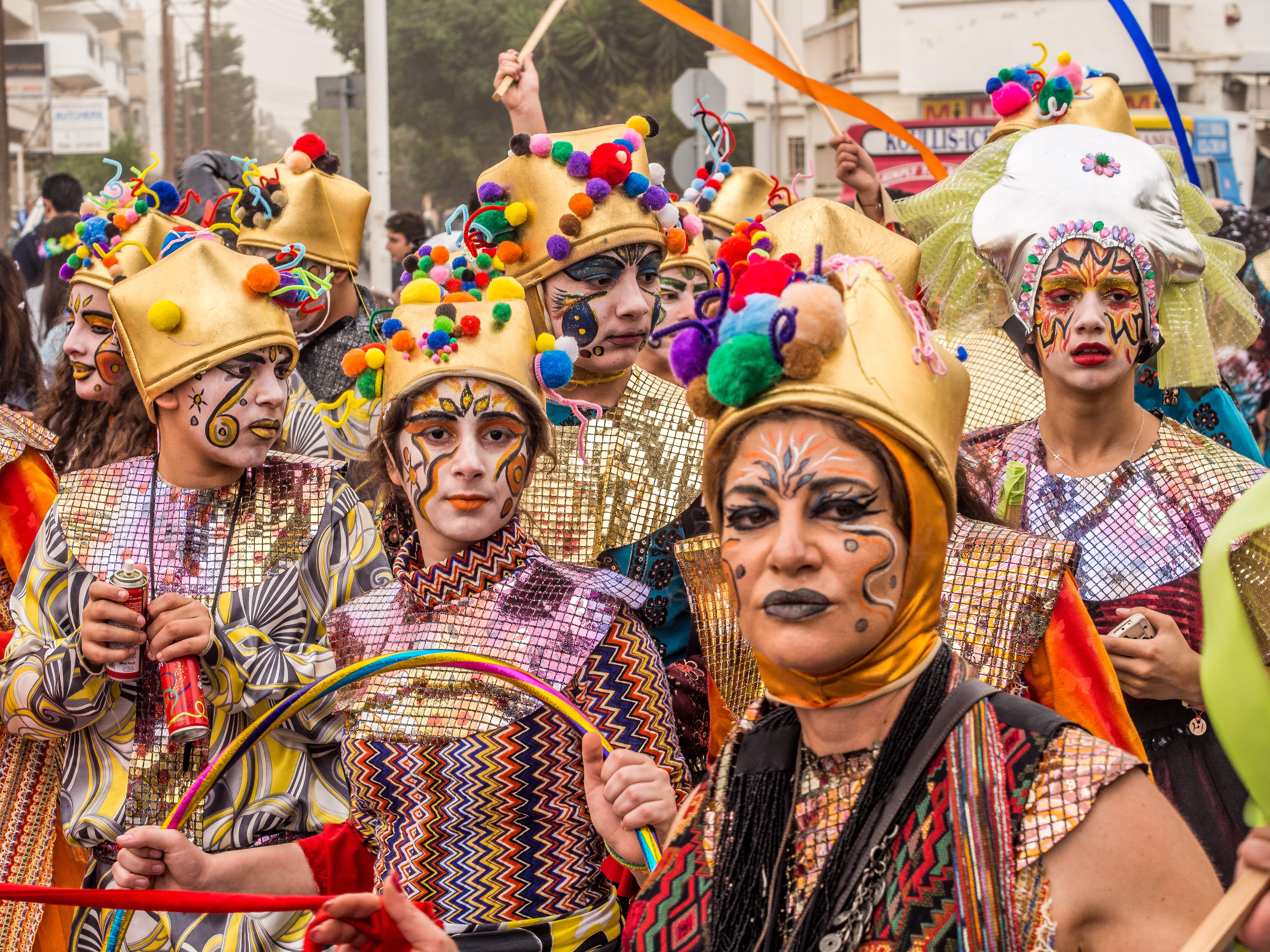
- 2014 Limassol Carnival
- Official name: Limassol Carnival
- Also called: Greek: Λεμεσιανό Καρναβάλι, romanized: Lemesianó Karnaváli
- Type: Secular
- Significance: The largest festival held annually in Limassol
- Celebrations: Costumes and parades
- Date: Sunday before Ash Monday
- Duration: 10 days
- Frequency: Annual
- First time: 1890; 136 years ago
- Started by: Limassol Municipality

The Limassol Carnival (Greek: Καρναβάλι Λεμεσού, romanized: Karnaváli Lemesoú) is an annual European carnival event held in Limassol, Cyprus. The main parade is held 12 days before the start of Lent, on the Sunday before Ash Monday, 50 days before Orthodox Easter. The festival is a colourful 10-day event of people eating, singing, satire, games, wearing costumes, and attending parties. The festival culminates with a large parade, which includes an array of floats traversing the city.

== History ==
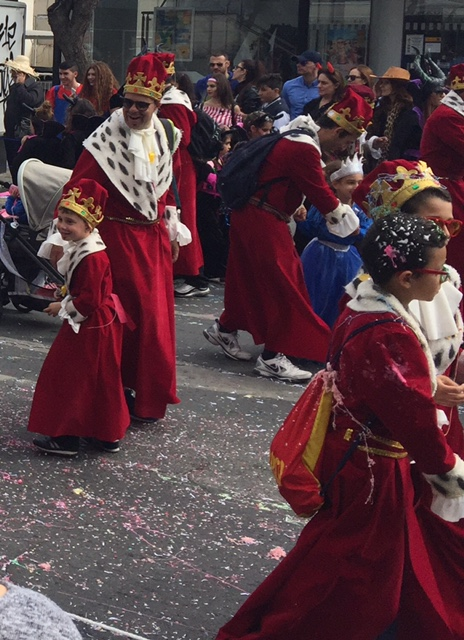
The Grand Parade with young participants

Limassol Carnival Festival, which is said to be an old custom traced to pagan rituals, is now held as an entertaining event. The local belief is that it is a Hellenistic heritage that dates to pre-Christian times and to an ancient Greek festival honoring Dionysus. However, the first written reference of the carnival is by Nеоphitos Egklistos, who accuses Cypriots of idolatry and accepting an alien tradition of celebrating the start of the Great Fast. The second historical mention is from Christophor Furkher Nirenberg, whо visited Cyprus in 1566 during a journey to the Holy Land. Nirenmberg was impressed by the carnival parades and told a story about how local noblemen organize feasts, where people dance, sing and have fun. As practiced now in Limassol, the carnival is a legacy from the Venetians who ruled Cyprus during the 15th–16th centuries. Unlike the Carnival of Venice, both adults and children can join the Limassol Carnival and as a rule, everyone pours foam on each other in the Old City. The celebrations are held in most towns around the island, but the event held in Limassol is the largest and most popular.

After some groups broke the ground rules in 2015, the Limassol municipality does not allow offending groups or floats from starting from the Enaerios junction and may intercept them at a later stage with the help of police and security guards. The new rules are as follows:

- The number of participants in each group should not exceed 500 people
- A large amount of alcohol is not allowed on the floats
- No DJ is allowed on board the vehicles
- Broadcasting music is forbidden
- Loudspeakers must be tuned into the radio frequency broadcasting music for the parade

The 2021 edition of the festival was cancelled due to the COVID-19 pandemic. Despite this, people arrived to celebrate the festival as they were allowed to have a "mini parade" which saw them remain in their cars and follow the route that the annual parade would usually take. Later in the day, more people arrived and the event turned into a street party, with most attendees ignoring social distancing rules and not wearing masks. Police eventually intervened. Limassol mayor Nicos Nicolaides said that he was "saddened and disappointed" by the behaviour of the attendees. 28 people and two businesses were fined by the police.

== Importance ==
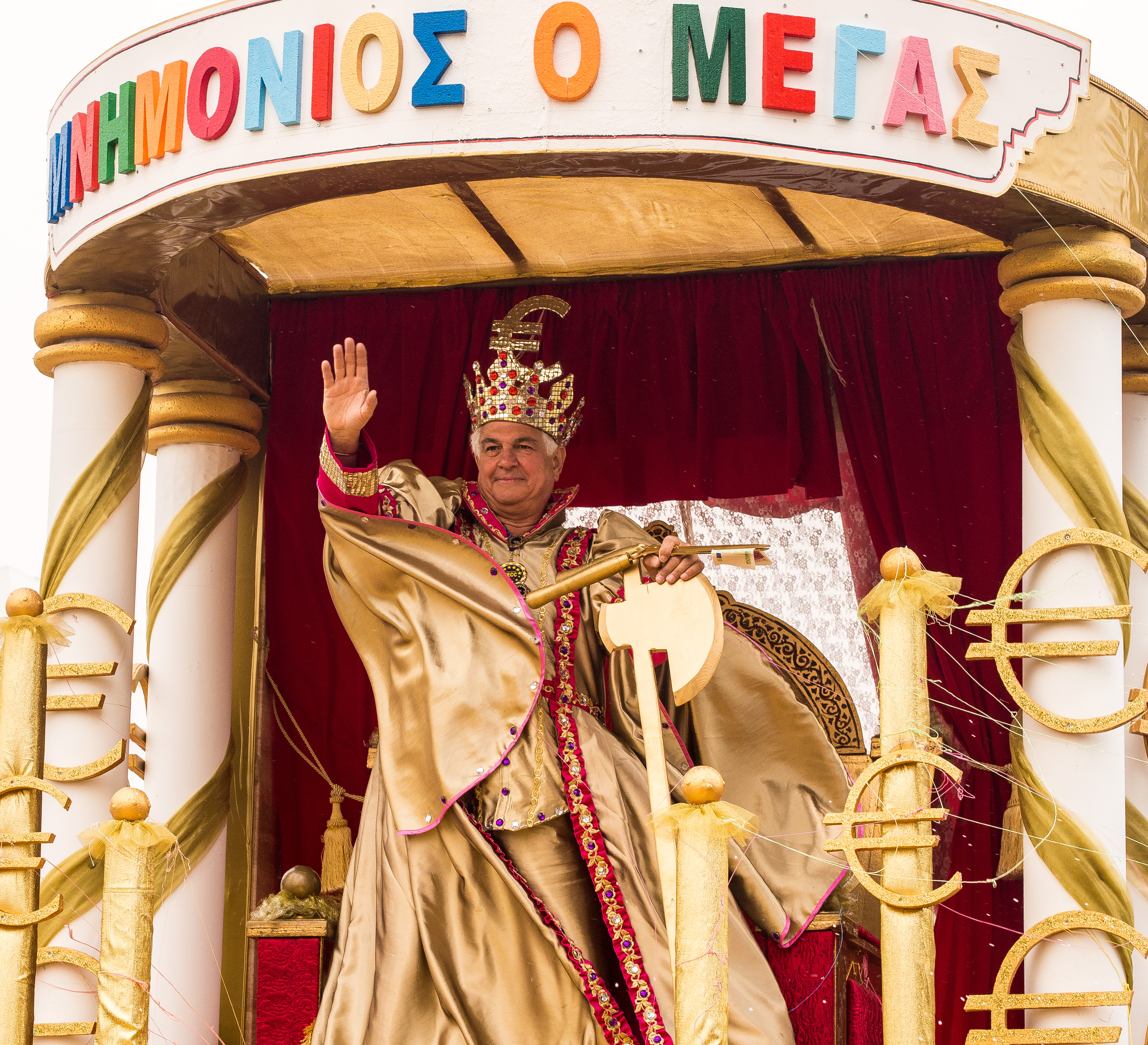
2014 Carnival King

Carnival has been celebrated in Cyprus for over a century, regardless of the political or economic conditions of the time. The epicentre of the Carnival in Cyprus is the seafront city of Limassol, the residents of which have a reputation for being the fun-loving and sociable. Carnival, a ritual which on the eve of spring, is an opportunity for people to express their faith and optimism for a good year. The municipality conducts a minimum of five events, which include an open-air event at Tepak Square. A children's parade, a key event of the carnival, is held on the first Sunday of the festive events. Children customarily dress in carnival costumes and parade down the streets of Limassol.

On the Grand Carnival parade the floats theme and the singing are commonly satirical. The Carnival King or Queen could be presented as a satirical figure representing social, political and economic conditions of relevance to Cyprus or Europe in general. On the final day which is the Grand Carnival, more than 150 floats and an estimated 50,000 people take part in the procession. The city's brass band and groups of drummers and mandolin-toting kantadoroi (serenaders) accompany the Carnival King (or Queen). During 2014 the satirical theme was the Carnival King depicted with Euro signs indicative of the economic crisis in Europe. On an earlier occasion the Carnival Queen was presented as Angela Merkel as they had then considered her responsible for the economic crisis in Cyprus.

== Themes ==
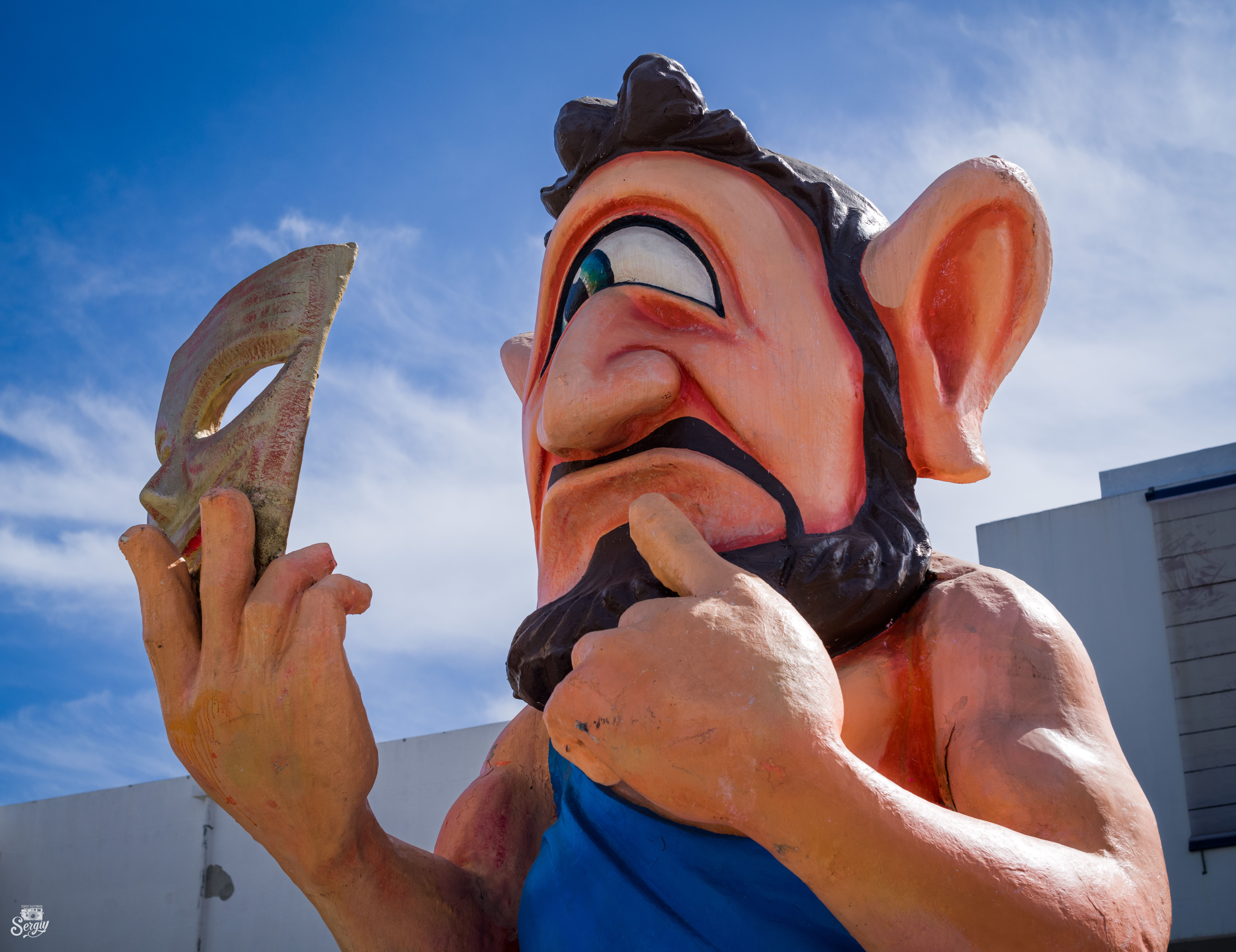
Limassol Carnival decoration

- The first week of the festival begins on a Thursday with entry of the King Carnival (as a satirical display it could be a Queen also) in a procession through the town which is decorated for the occasion followed by a grand fancy dress competition of children that is held at the Tsirion Athletic Stadium. The first week also marks the Meat Week (Kreatini), which is the last week for eating meat before Easter. The day the festival starts is also known as "Tsiknopempti" (meaning "Stinky Thursday"), a name attributed to the cooking aromas of meat pervading the streets.
- In the second week of the festival, which is called the cheese week (Tyrini), dairy products are consumed. At the end of the week on a Sunday the celebration includes the Grand Carnival parade which is taken through the Makariou Avenue of Limassol. People from all parts of the island gather to watch the "floats with the serenade and other masqueraded groups."
- Throughout the festival period most hotels and clubs in the city hold fancy dress balls and parties. Clowns, cowboys, pirates, dragons, ancient Greeks and medieval knights are popular themes, but pop stars along with characters from the year's hit movies and musicals are also a common sight.

== Location ==
The Limassol Municipality organizes the final Carnival Grand Parade through Makariou Avenue (~7 kilometres (4.3 mi)), Limassol's high street.

== Images ==
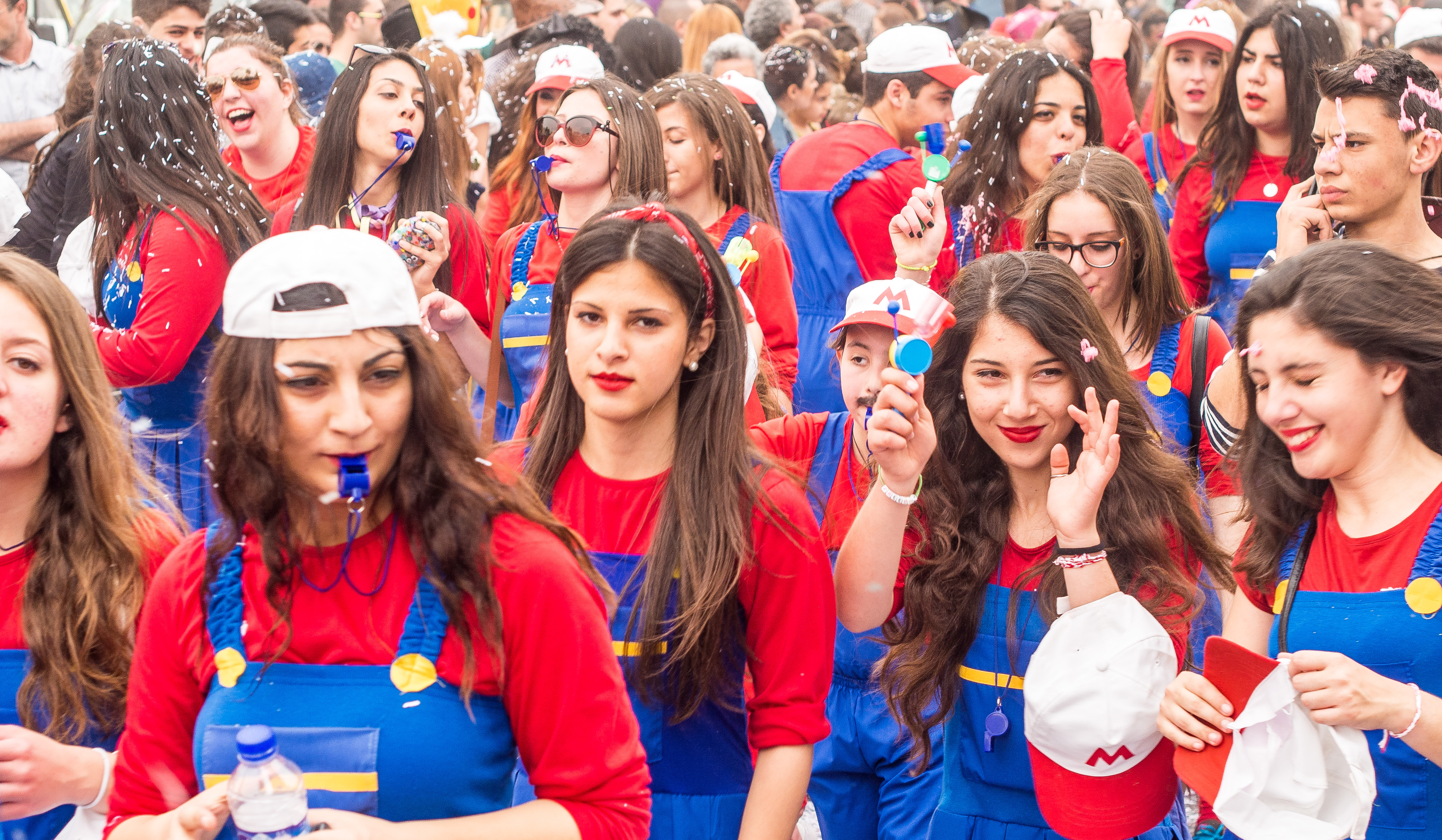
Super Mario costumes in the 2014 carnival

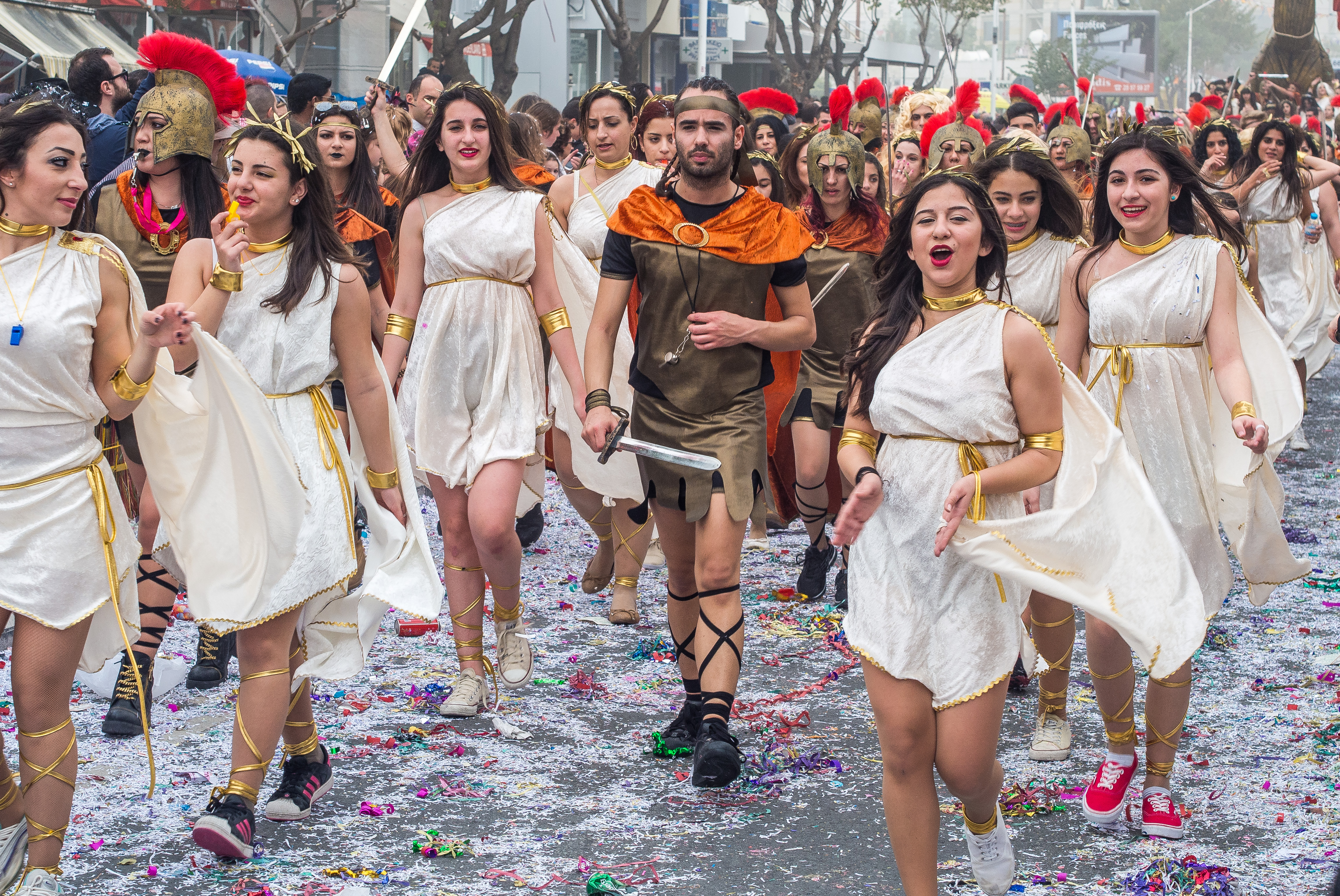
Roman-Hellenic theme in the 2014 carnival

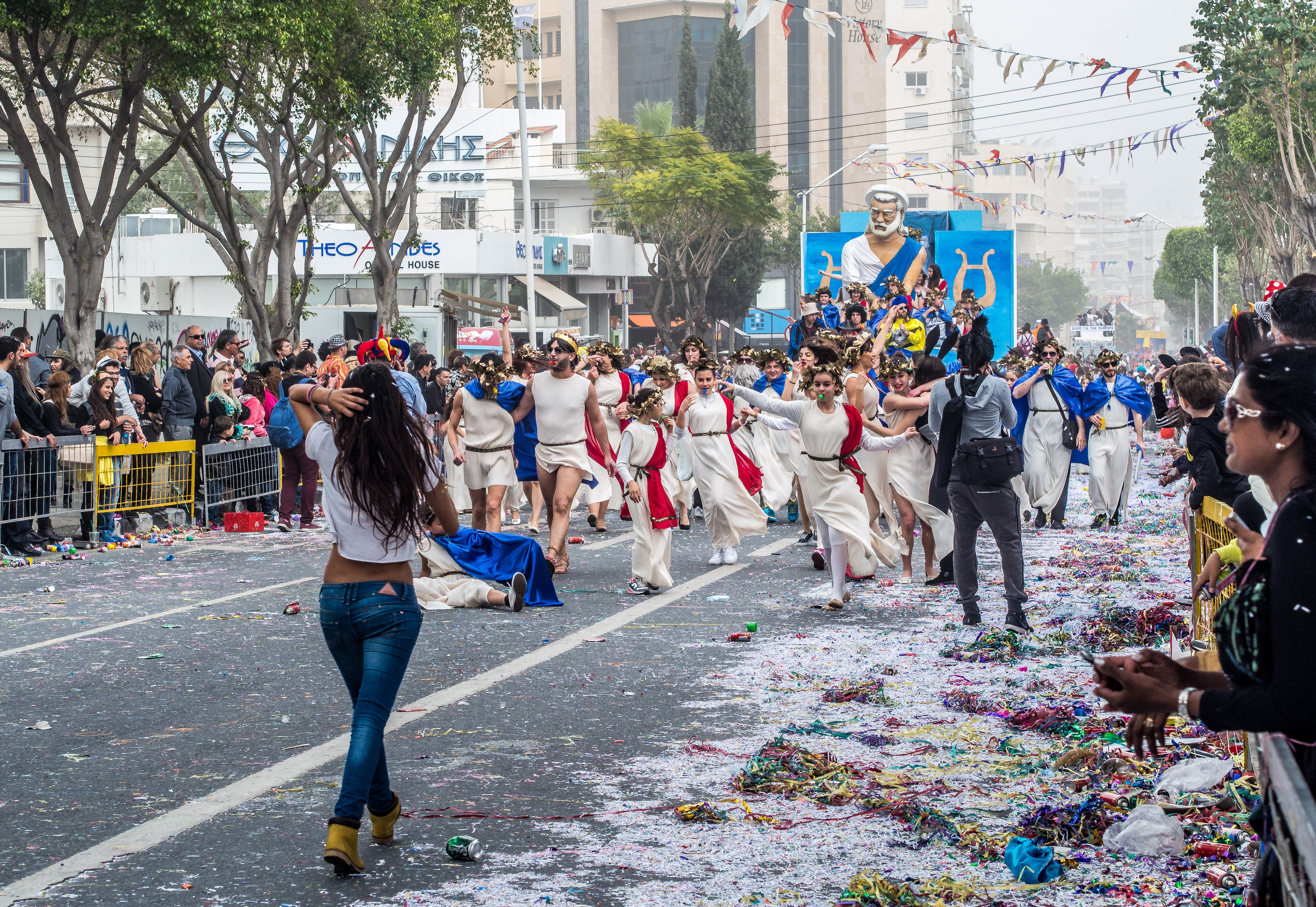
Zeus costumes in the 2014 Carnival

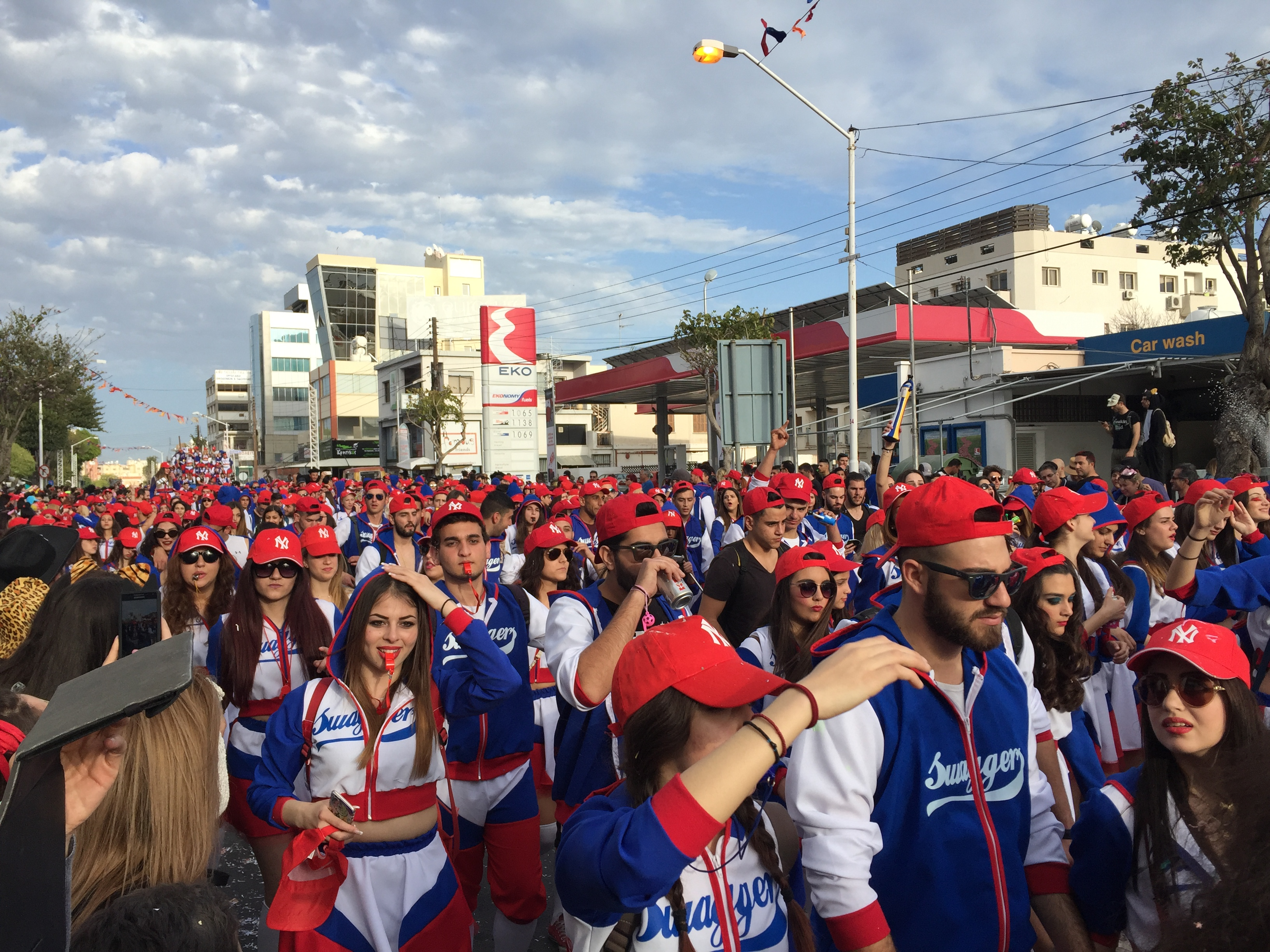
Ground view of the 2016 carnival

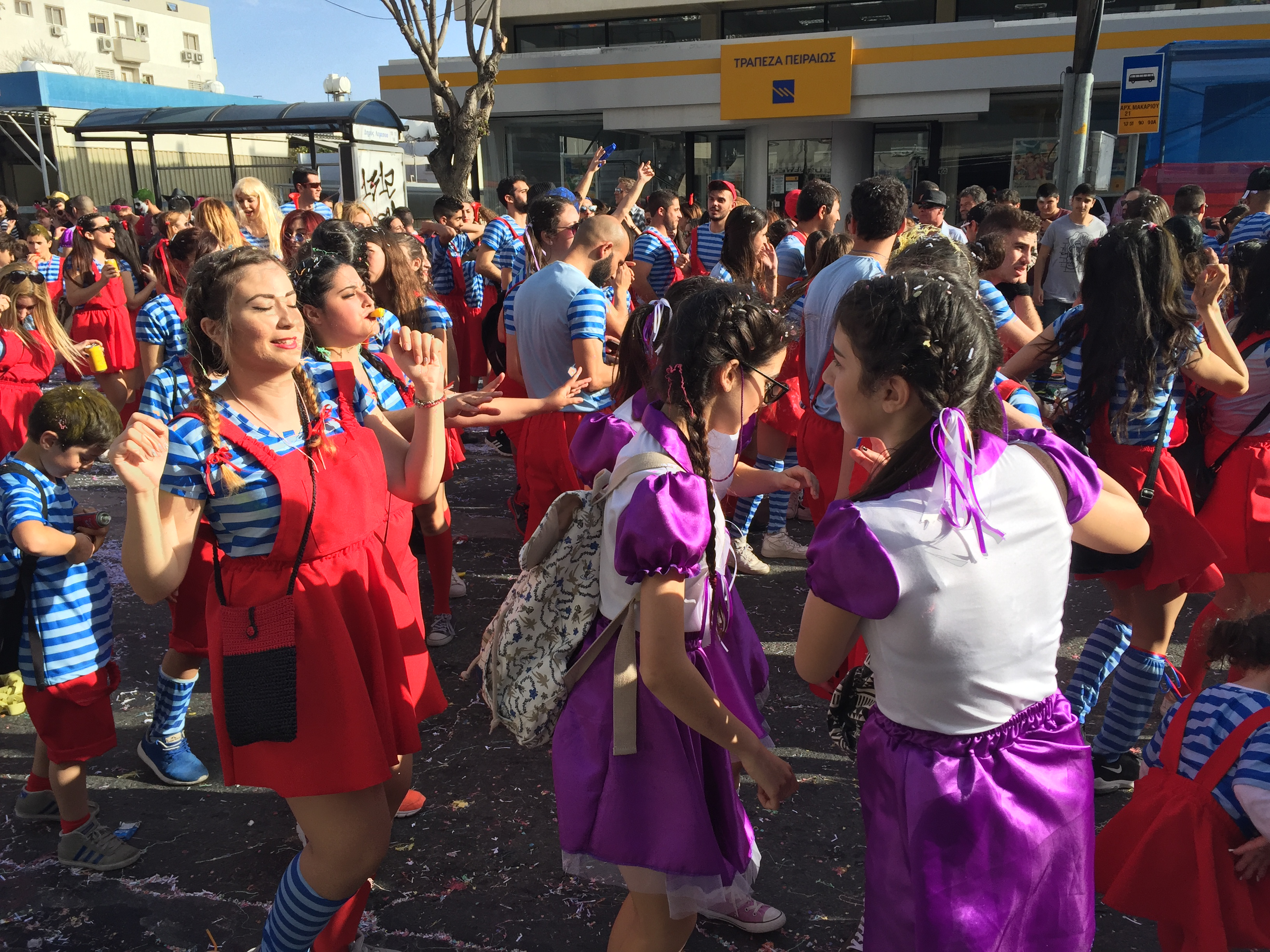
Children in the 2016 carnival

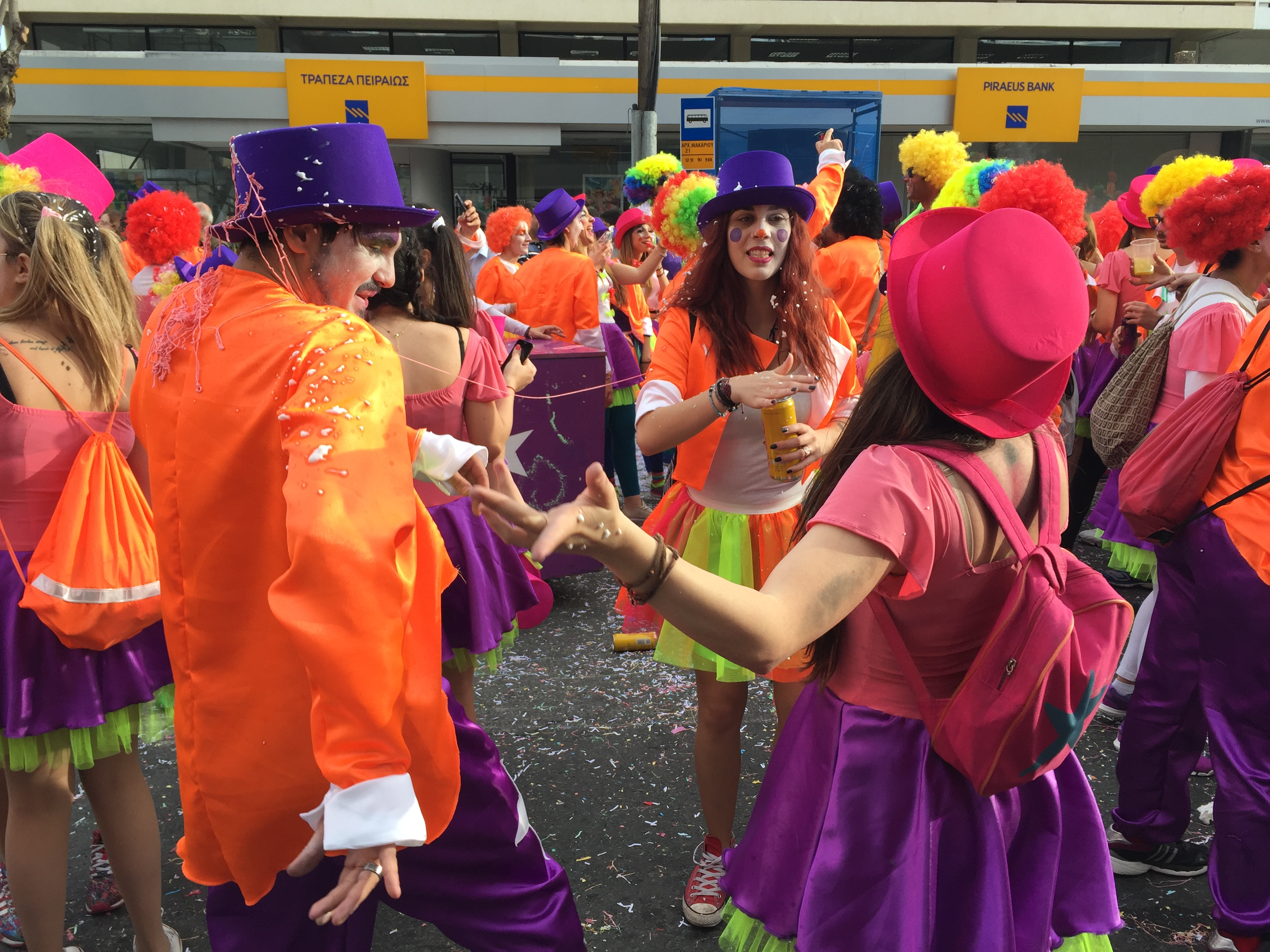
Crowd dancing in the 2016 carnival

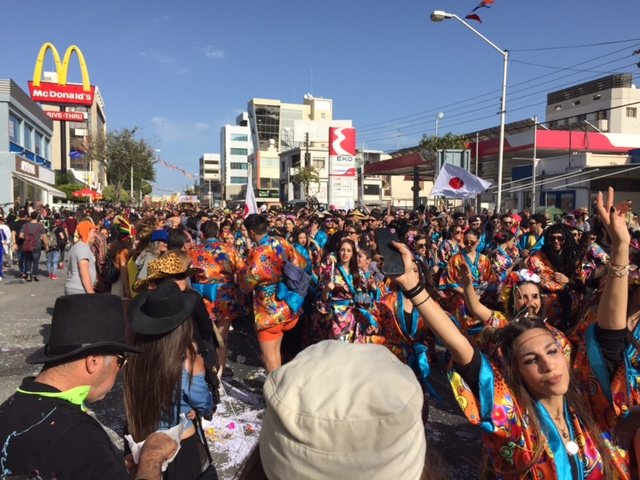
Kimono costumes in the 2016 carnival

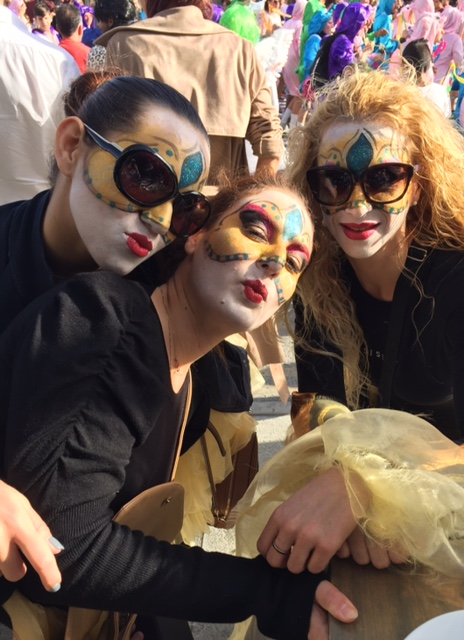
Costumes in the 2016 carnival

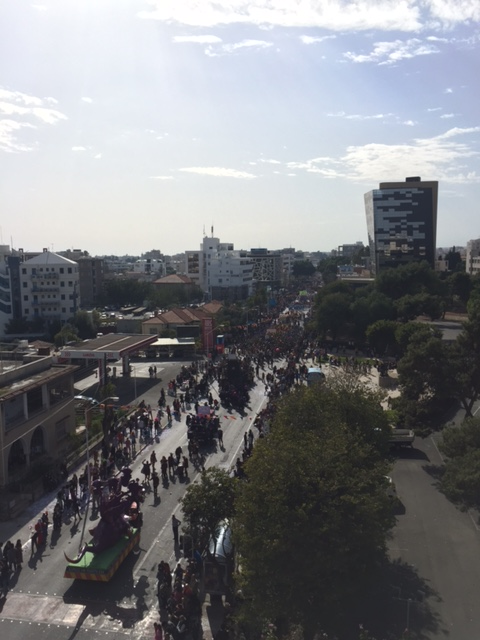
Aerial view of Makariou Avenue from the 2016 carnival

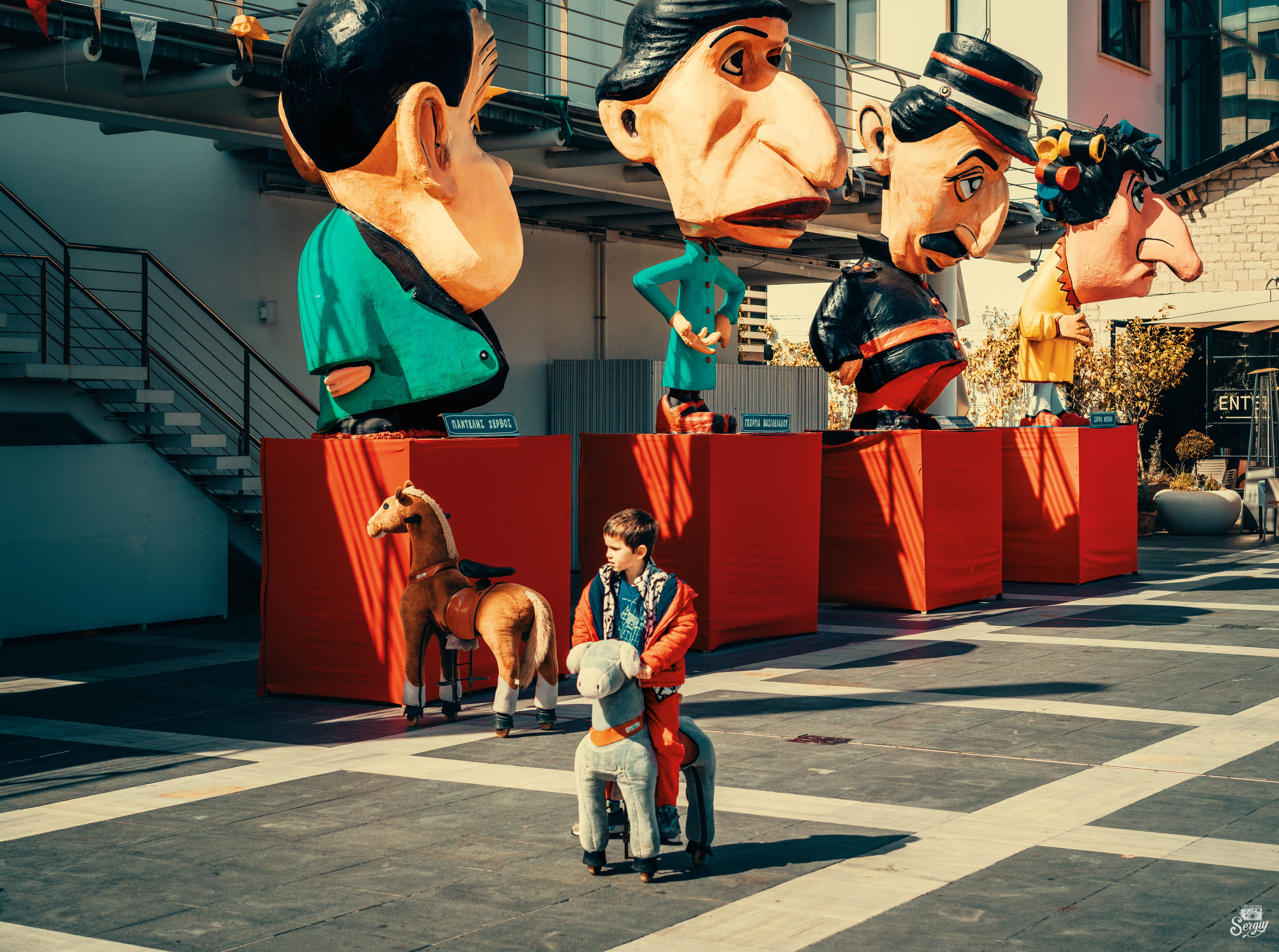
Carnival Decoration in the Limassol Marina, in 2016

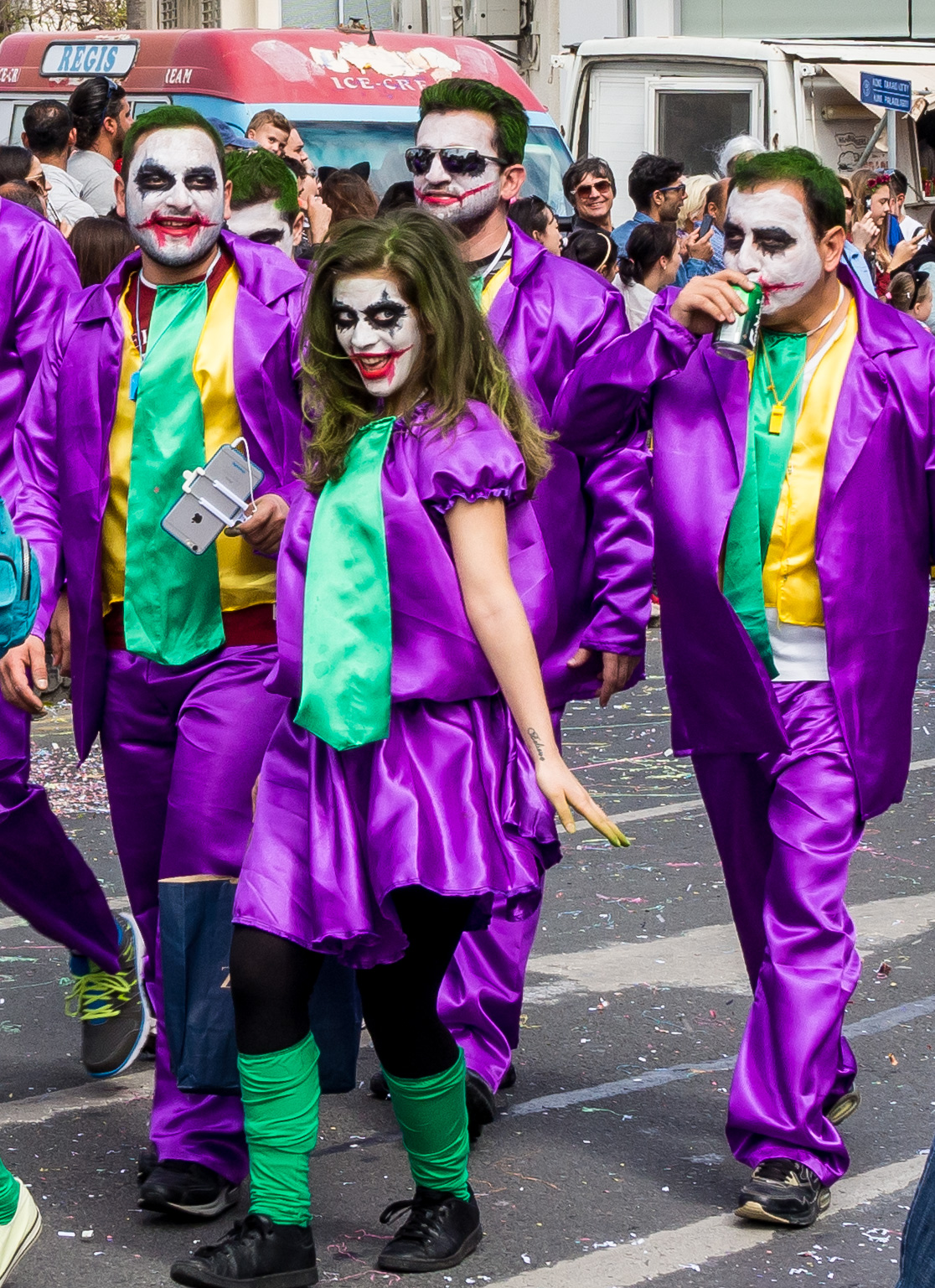
Joker costumes in the 2016 carnival

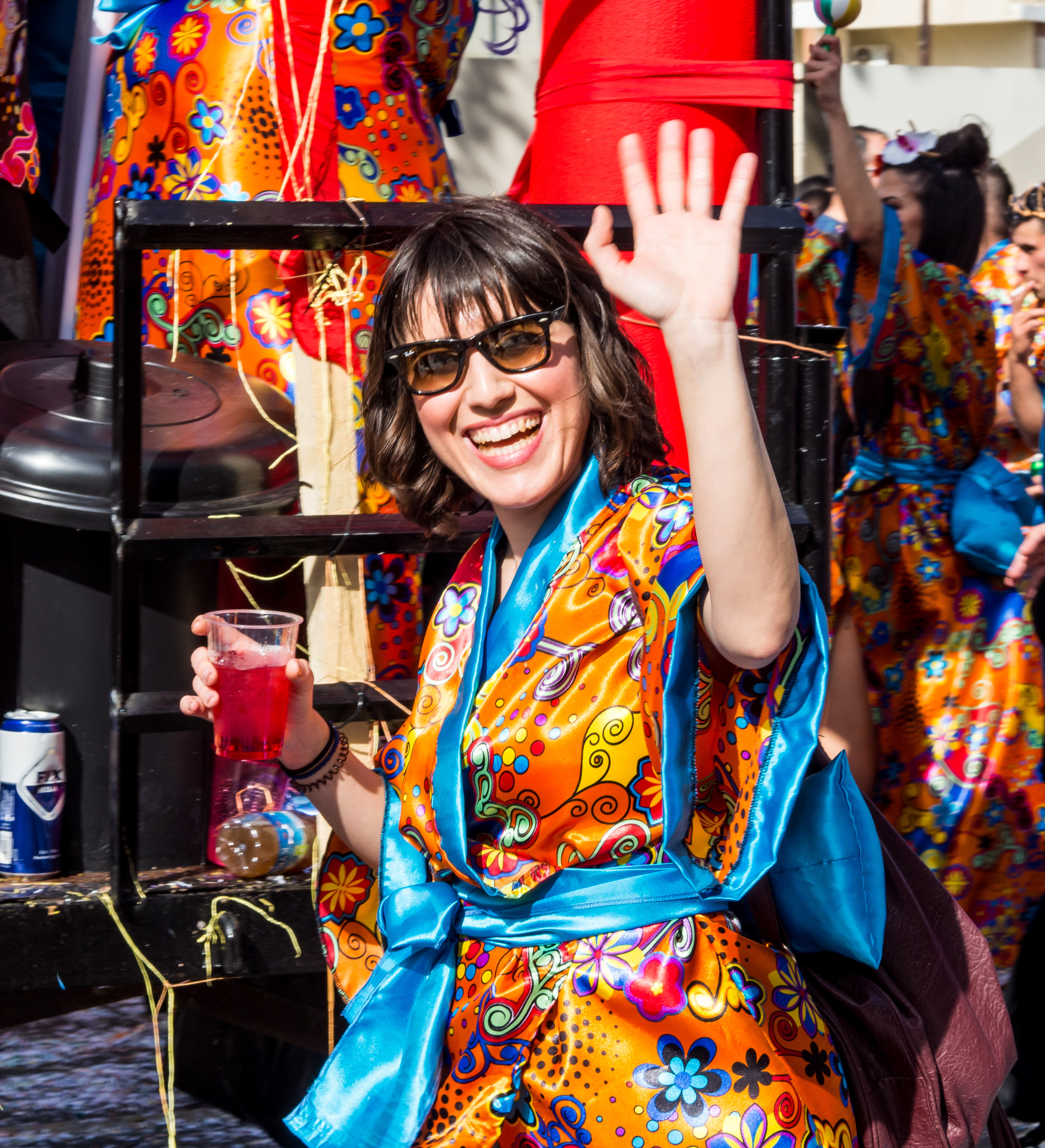
Kimono costumes in the 2016 carnival

== See also ==
- Masquerade ball

== Bibliography ==
- Cyprus Country Study Guide Volume 1 Strategic Information and Developments. Washington, D.C.: International Business Publications. 2013. ISBN 978-1-4387-7423-7.
- Antoniadou, Zoe Andrea (1992). The Gradual Destruction of the Urban and Cultural Environment in Limassol, Cyprus. University of California, Berkeley.
- Merin, Jennifer; Burdick, Elizabeth B. (1 November 1979). International directory of theatre, dance, and folklore festivals: a project of the International Theatre Institute of the United States, inc. Greenwood Press. ISBN 978-0-313-20993-2.
