= APEN Agiou Athanasiou =

Cyprian handball team

ENOSI NEON Agiou Athanasiou
- Full name: ENOSI NEON Agiou Athanasiou
- Founded: 1930
- Arena: Likio Linopetra; Limassol, Cyprus
- Capacity: 500
- President: (Cyprus) Kypros Matheou
- League: A1 Cyprus Men League
- 2012-13: 7th
Home	Away

Enosi Neon (former name APEN) Agiou Athanasiou is a professional handball team based in Limassol, Cyprus. It used to play for the Cypriot First Division.

== Players ==
- Ioannou Lenos
- Stefanos Stefanou
