= Linear Pottery culture =

Archaeological horizon of Neolithic Europe

- Horizon: Old Europe
- Geographical range: Central Europe
- Period: Neolithic
- Dates: c. 5500 BC — c. 4500 BC
- Major sites: Langweiler, Bylany, Nitra, Zwenkau, Brunn am Gebirge, Elsloo, Sittard, Lindenthal, Aldenhoven, Flomborn, Rixheim, Rössen, Osłonki, Eythra, Vráble
- Preceded by: Starčevo–Kőrös–Criș culture, Mesolithic Europe
- Followed by: Stroke-ornamented ware culture, Rössen culture, Lengyel culture, Cucuteni-Trypillian culture, Michelsberg culture, Funnelbeaker culture, Hinkelstein culture, Cerny culture, Chasséen culture, Boian culture, Tisza culture

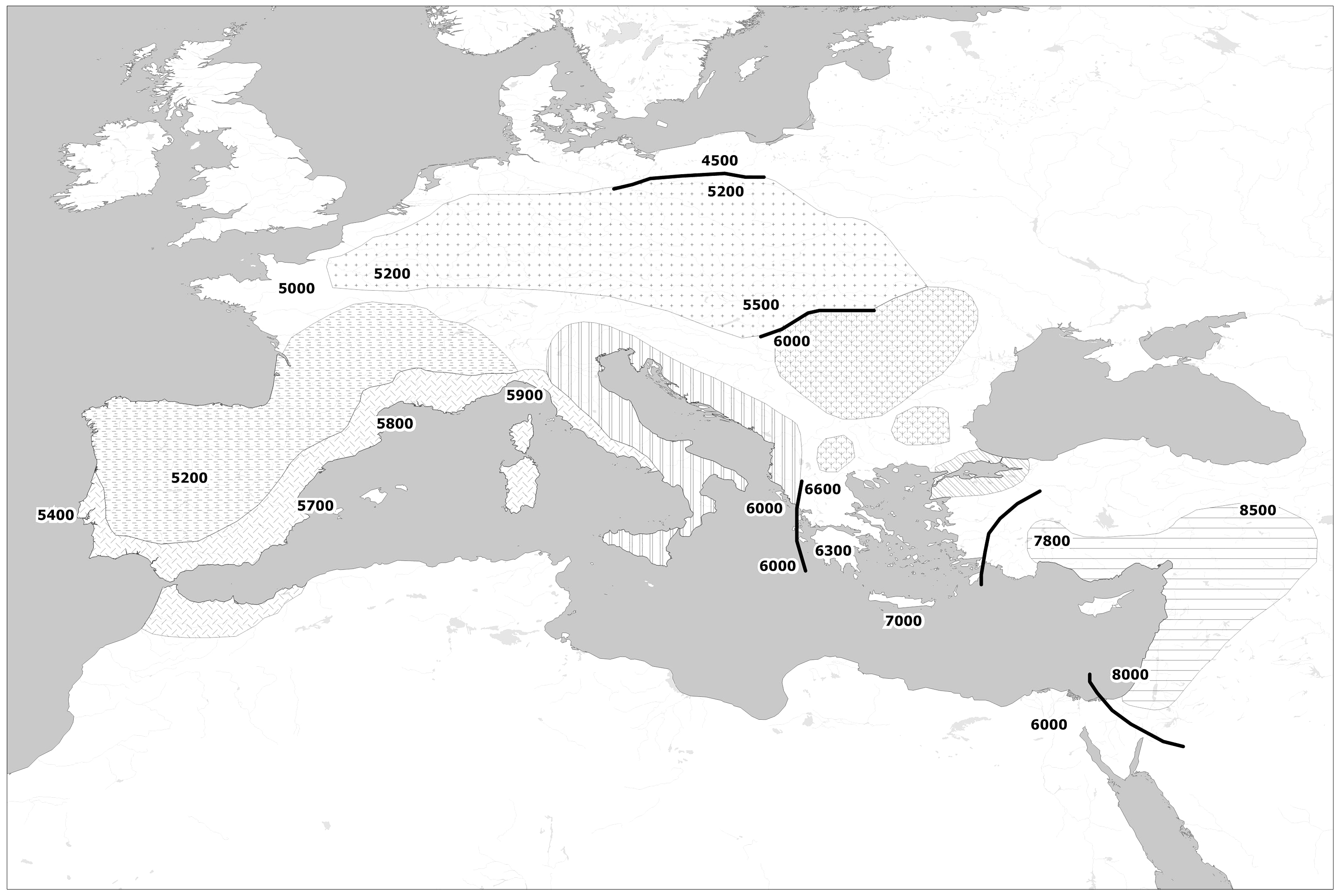
Map showing the Neolithic expansions from the 7th to the 5th millennium BC

The Linear Pottery culture (LBK) is a major archaeological horizon of the European Neolithic period, flourishing c. 5500–4500 BC. Derived from the German Linearbandkeramik, it is also known as the Linear Band Ware, Linear Ware, Linear Ceramics or Incised Ware culture, falling within the Danubian I culture of V. Gordon Childe.

Most cultural evidence has been found on the middle Danube, the upper and middle Elbe, and the upper and middle Rhine. It represents a major event in the initial spread of agriculture in Europe. The pottery consists of simple cups, bowls, vases, jugs without handles and, in a later phase, with pierced lugs, bases, and necks.

Important sites include Vráble and Nitra in Slovakia; Bylany in the Czech Republic; Langweiler and Zwenkau (Eythra) in Germany; Brunn am Gebirge in Austria; Elsloo, Sittard, Lindenthal, Aldenhoven, Flomborn, and Rixheim on the Rhine; Lautereck and Hienheim on the upper Danube; and Rössen and Sonderhausen on the middle Elbe. In 2019, two large rondel complexes were discovered east of the Vistula near Toruń in Poland.

A number of cultures ultimately replaced the Linear Pottery culture over its range, but without a one-to-one correspondence between its variants and the replacing cultures. Some of the successor cultures are the Hinkelstein, Großgartach, Rössen, Lengyel, Cucuteni–Trypillia, and Boian cultures.

== Name ==
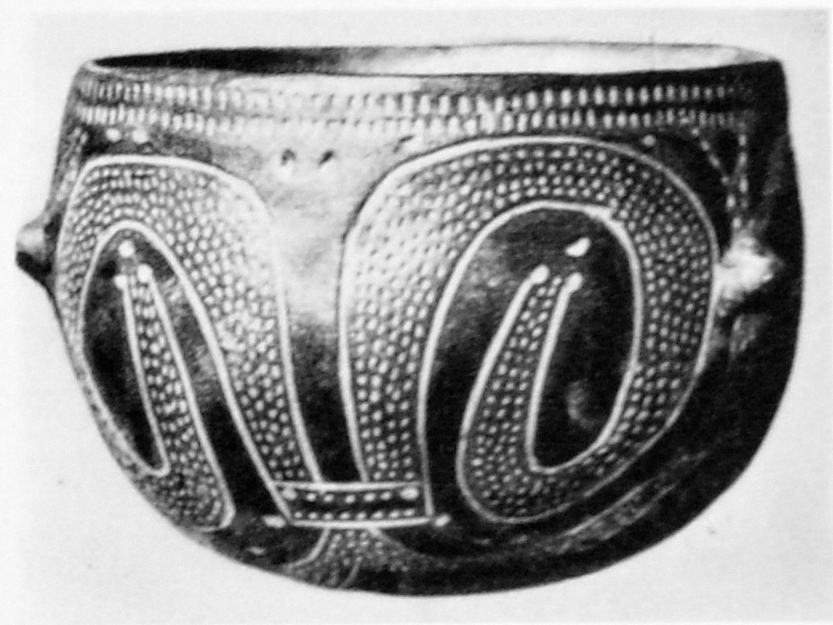
Linear Pottery

The term "Linear Band Ware" derives from the pottery's decorative technique. The "Band Ware" or Bandkeramik part of it began as an innovation of the German archaeologist, Friedrich Klopfleisch (1831–1898). The earliest generally accepted name in English was the Danubian of V. Gordon Childe. Most names in English are attempts to translate Linearbandkeramik.

Since Starčevo-Körös pottery was earlier than the LBK and was located in a contiguous food-producing region, the early investigators looked for precedents there. Much of the Starčevo-Körös pottery features decorative patterns composed of convolute bands of paint: spirals, converging bands, vertical bands, and so on. The LBK appears to imitate and often improve these convolutions with incised lines; hence the term, linear, to distinguish incised band ware from painted band ware.

The name depends on specialized meanings of "linear" and "band", whether in English or in German. These words without the qualifiers do not describe the decoration. There are few bands going around the pottery and the lines are mainly not straight.

== Geography and chronology ==
It began in regions of densest occupation on the middle Danube (Bohemia, Moravia, Hungary) and spread over about 1,500 km (930 mi) along the rivers in 360 years. The rate of expansion was therefore about 4 km (2.5 mi) per year.

The LBK was concentrated somewhat inland from the coastal areas; i.e., it is not evidenced in Denmark or the northern coastal strips of Germany and Poland, or the coast of the Black Sea in Romania. The northern coastal regions remained occupied by Mesolithic cultures exploiting the then rich Atlantic salmon runs. There are lighter concentrations of LBK in the Netherlands, such as at Elsloo, Netherlands, with the sites of Darion, Remicourt, Fexhe, or Waremme-Longchamps and at the mouths of the Oder and Vistula. Evidently, the Neolithics and Mesolithics were not excluding each other.

The LBK at maximum extent ranged from about the line of the Seine–Oise (Paris Basin) eastward to the line of the Dnieper, and southward to the line of the upper Danube down to the big bend. An extension ran through the Southern Bug valley, leaped to the valley of the Dniester, and swerved southward from the middle Dniester to the lower Danube in eastern Romania, east of the Carpathians.

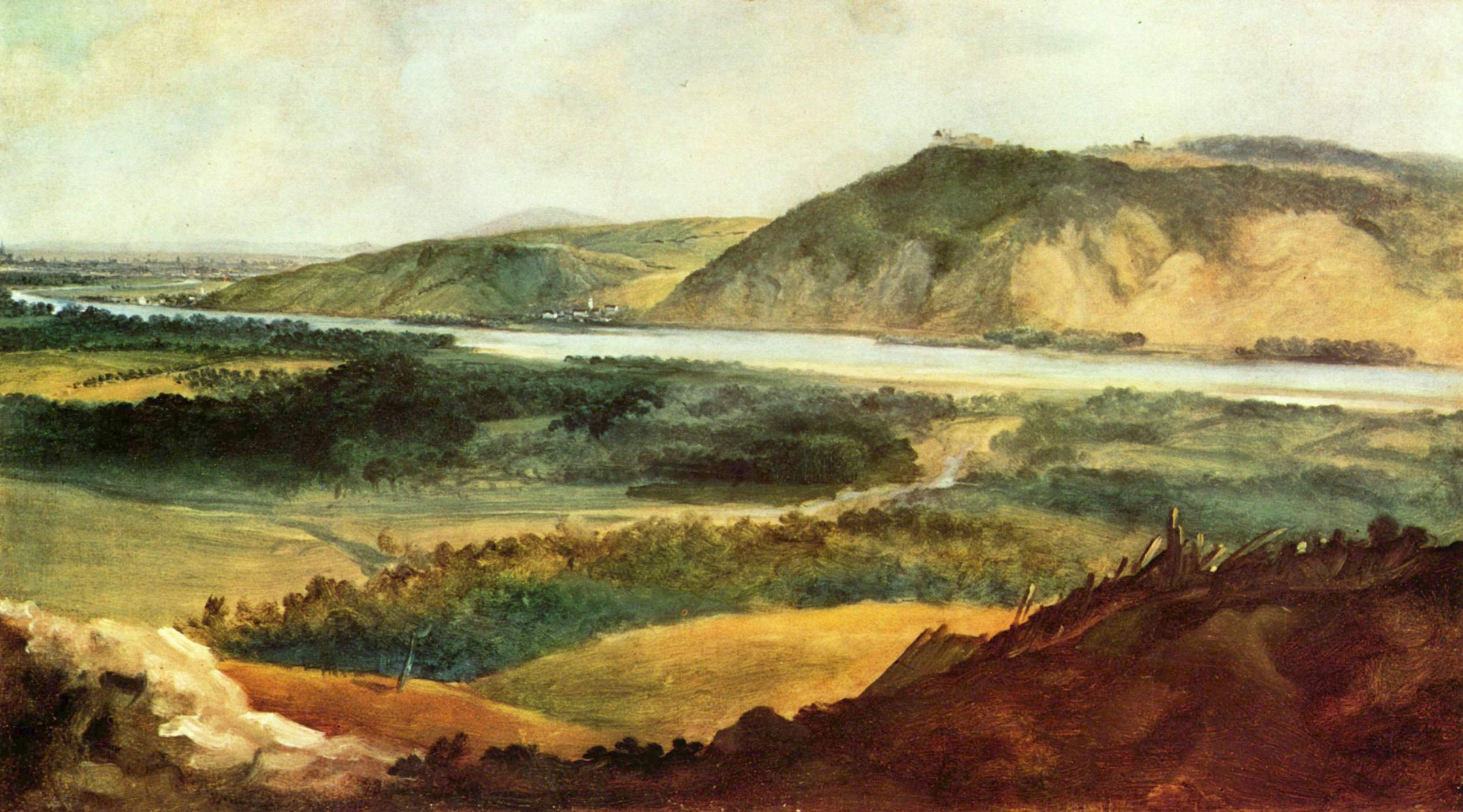
Danube lands near Vienna

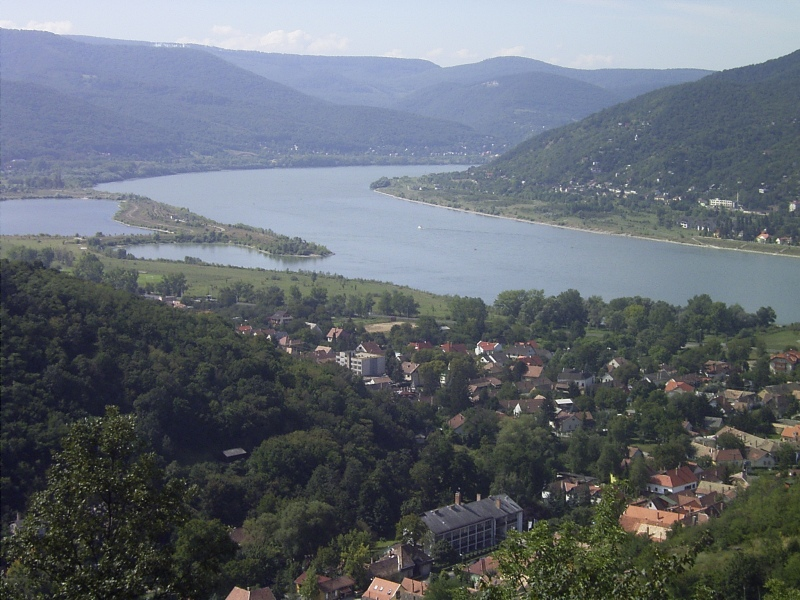
The Danube bend in Hungary

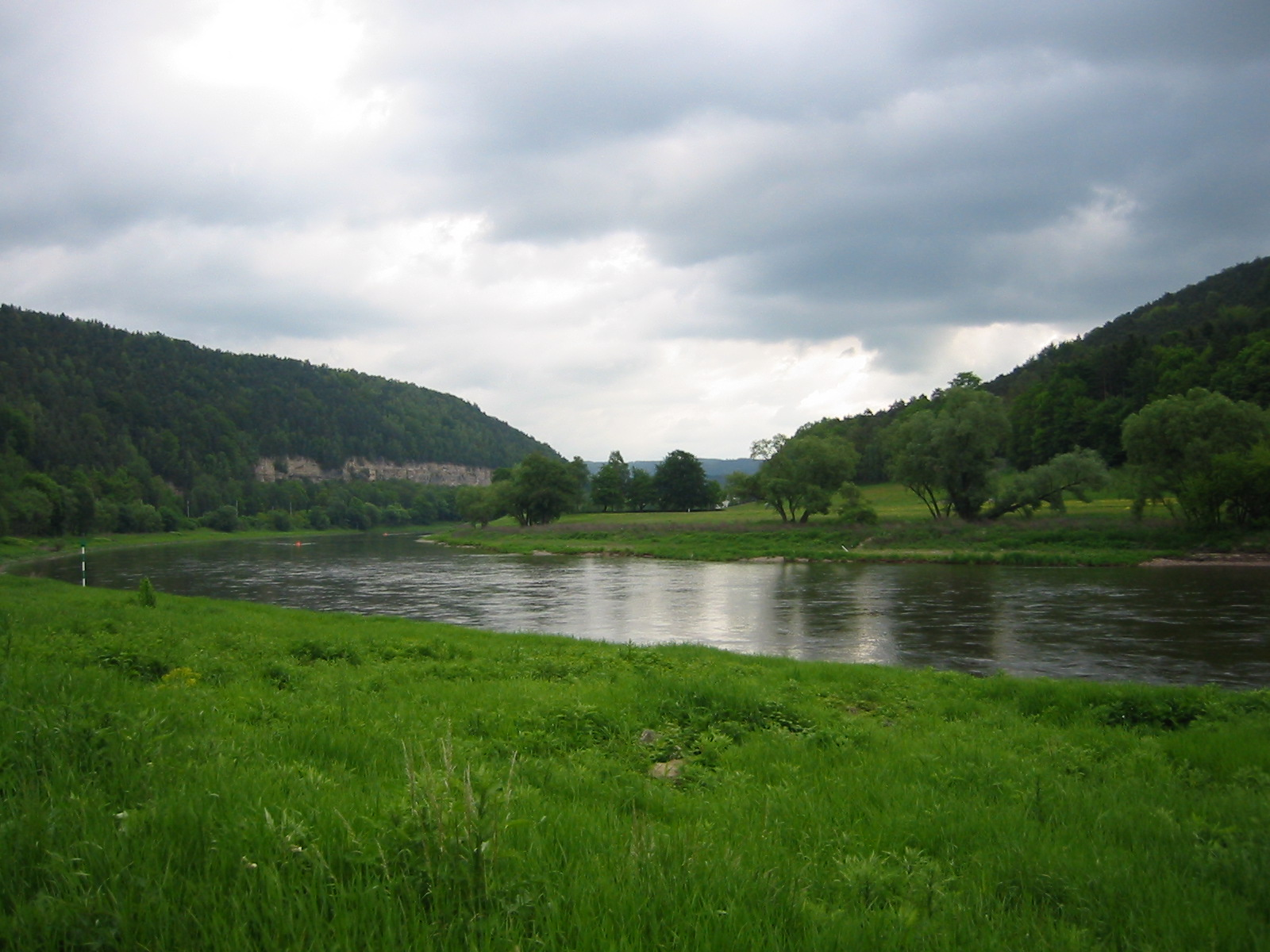
The Elbe

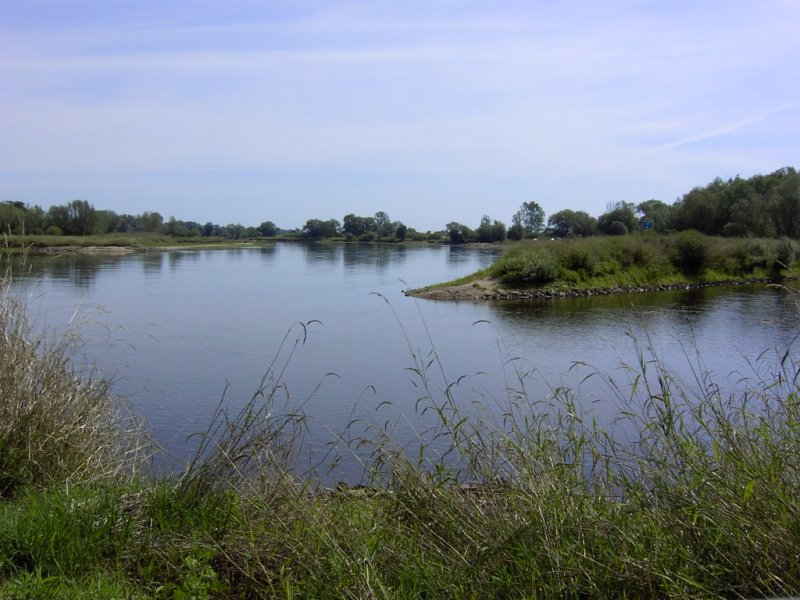
The Oder

=== Periodization ===
A significant number of C-14 dates has been estimated for the LBK, making possible statistical analyses, which have been performed on different sample groups. One such analysis by Stadler and Lennais sets 68.2% confidence limits at about 5430–5040 BC; that is, 68.2% of possible dates allowed by variation of the major factors that influence measurement, calculation, and calibration fall within that range. The 95.4% confidence interval is 5600–4750 BC.

Data continue to be acquired and therefore any single analysis only serves as a rough guideline. Overall, it is probable that the Linear Pottery culture spanned several hundred years of continental European prehistory in the late sixth and early fifth millennia BC, with local variations. Data from Belgium indicate a late survival of LBK there, as late as 4100 BC.

The Linear Pottery culture was not the only culture in prehistoric Europe. It is distinguished from the Neolithic cultures, which is done by dividing the Neolithic of Europe into chronological phases. These have varied a great deal. An approximation is:

- Early Neolithic, 6000–5500. The first appearance of food-producing cultures in the south of the future Linear Pottery culture range: the Körös of southern Hungary and the Dniester culture in Ukraine.
- Middle Neolithic, 5500–5000. Early and Middle Linear Pottery culture.
- Late Neolithic, 5000–4500. Late Linear Pottery and legacy cultures.

The last phase is no longer the end of the Neolithic. A "Final Neolithic" has been added to the transition between the Neolithic and the Bronze Age. All numbers depend to some extent on the geographic region.

The pottery styles of the LBK allow some division of its window in time. Conceptual schemes have varied somewhat. One is:

- Early: The Eastern and Western LBK cultures, originating on the middle Danube
- Middle: Musical Note pottery – the incised lines of the decoration are broken or terminated by punctures, or "strokes", giving the appearance of musical notes. The culture expanded to its maximum extent, and regional variants appeared. One variant is the late Bug–Dniester culture.
- Late: Stroke-ornamented ware – lines of punctures are substituted for the incised lines.

=== Early or Western ===
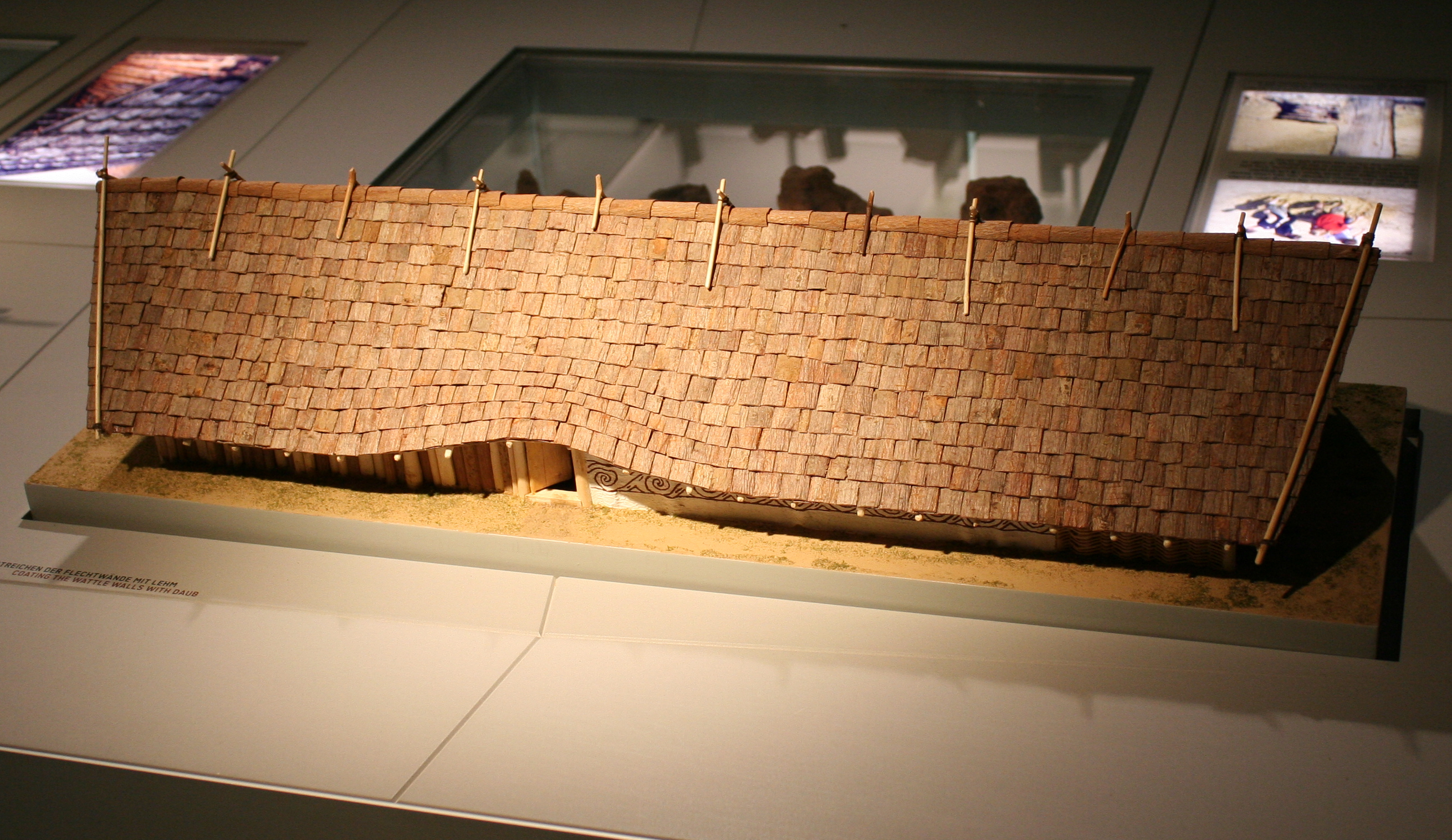

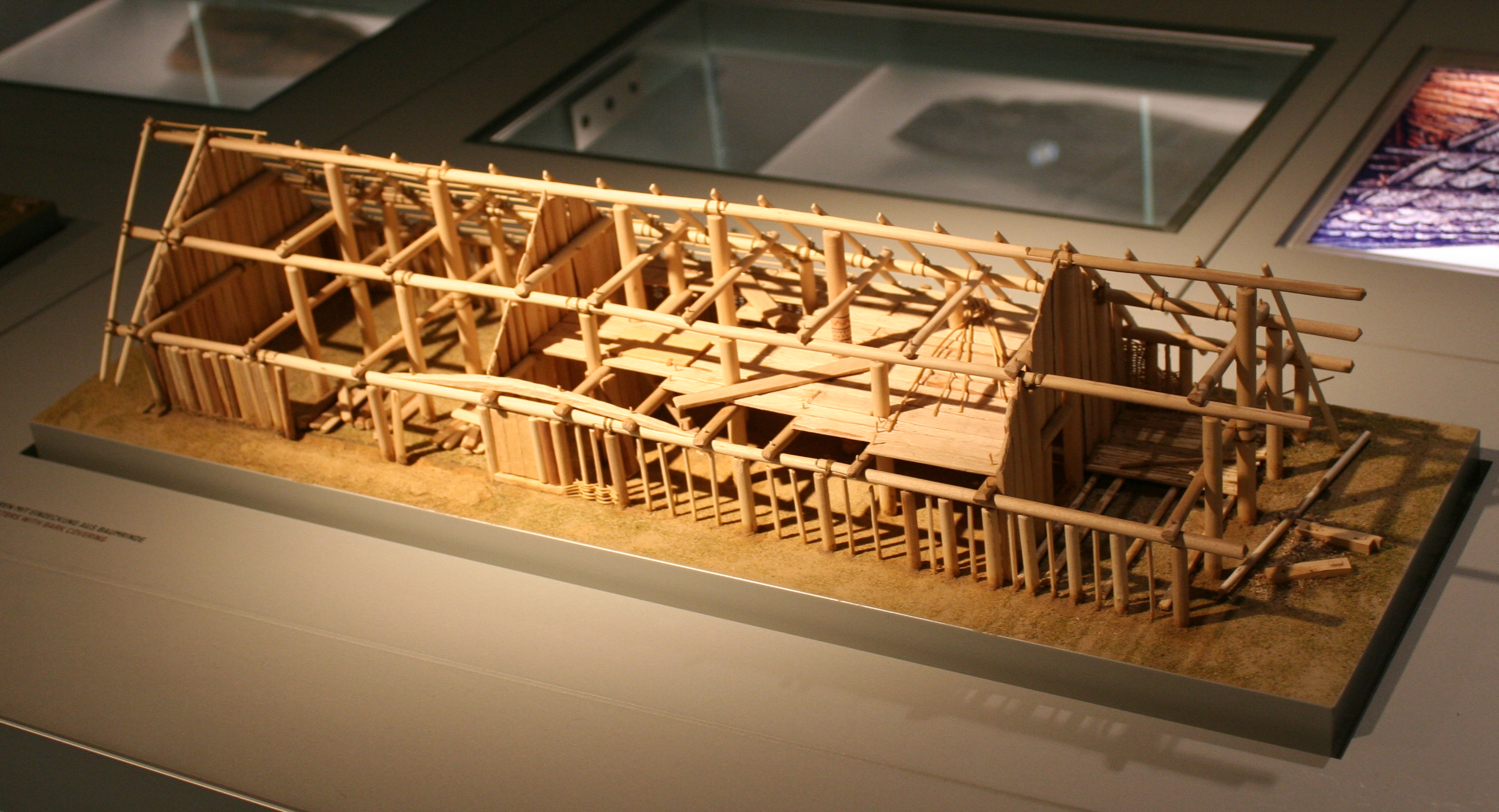

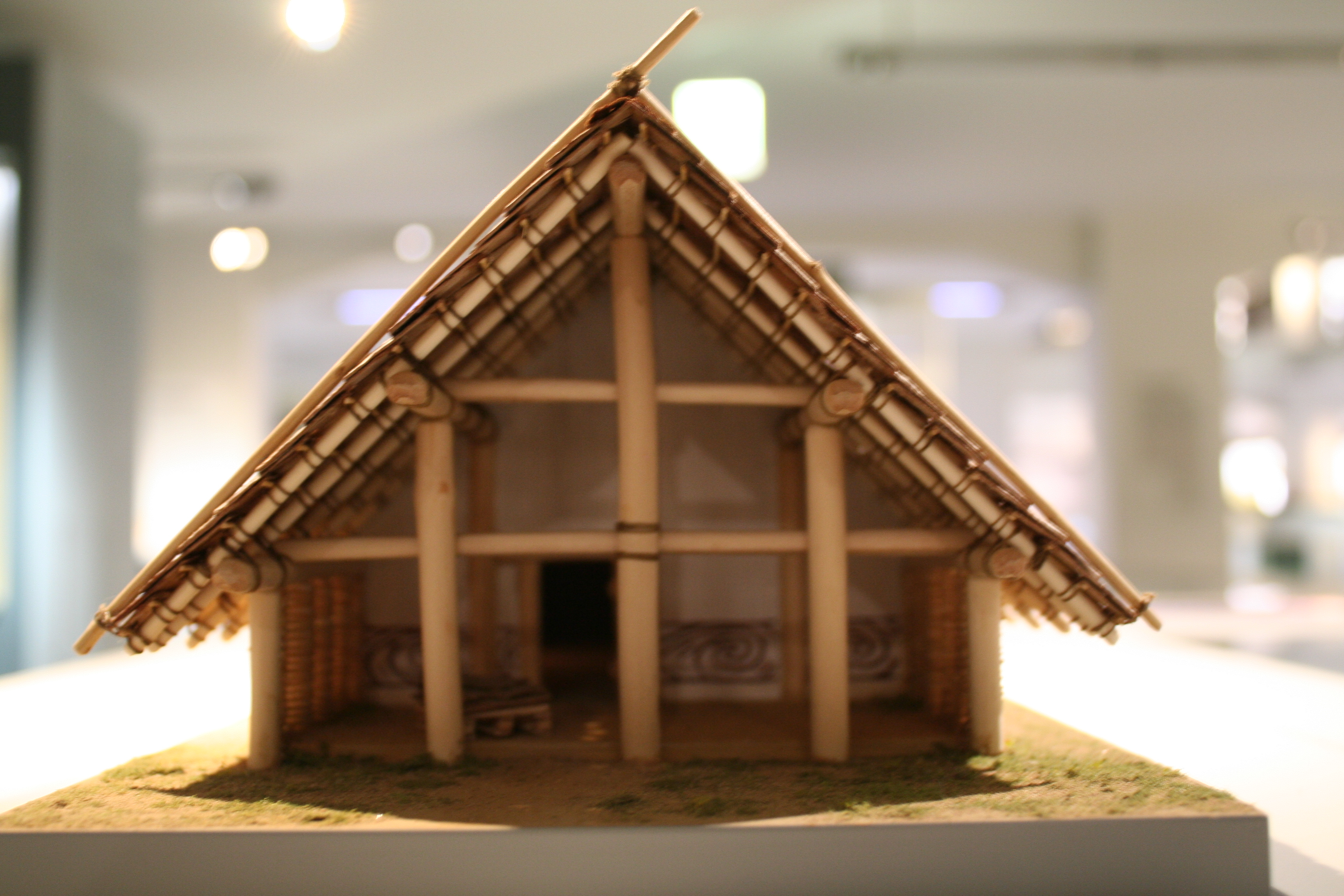

The early or earliest Western Linear Pottery culture began conventionally at 5500 BC, possibly as early as 5700 BC, developed on the middle Danube, including western Hungary, and was carried down the Rhine, Elbe, Oder, and Vistula. It is sometimes called the Central European Linear Pottery (CELP) to distinguish it from the ALP phase of the Bükk culture. In Hungarian, it is called dunántúli vonaldíszes kerámia (DVK), translated as "Transdanubian Linear Pottery". A number of local styles and phases of ware are defined.

The end of the early phase can be dated to its arrival in the Netherlands at about 5200 BC. The population there was already food-producing to some extent. The early phase went on there, but meanwhile the Music Note Pottery (Notenkopfkeramik) phase of the Middle Linear Band Pottery culture appeared in Austria at about 5200 BC and moved eastward into Romania and Ukraine. The late phase, or Stroke-ornamented ware culture (Stichbandkeramik (SBK), 5000–4500 BC) evolved in central Europe and went eastward, moving down the Vistula and Elbe.

=== Eastern ===
The Eastern Linear Pottery culture developed in eastern Hungary and Transylvania roughly contemporaneously with, perhaps a few hundred years after, the Transdanubian. The great plain there (Hungarian Alföld) had been occupied by the Starčevo culture of "gracile Mediterraneans" from the Balkans as early as 6100 BC. Hertelendi and others give a reevaluated date range of 5860–5330 for the Early Neolithic, 5950–5400 for the Körös. The Körös Culture went as far north as the edge of the upper Tisza and stopped. North of it the Alföld plain and the Bükk mountains were intensively occupied by Mesolithics thriving on the flint tool trade.

At around 5330 BC, the classical Alföld culture of the LBK appeared to the north of the Körös culture and flourished until about 4940. This time also is the Middle Neolithic. The Alföld culture has been abbreviated AVK from its Hungarian name, Alföldi Vonaldíszes Kerámia, or ALP for Alföld Linear Pottery culture, the earliest variant of the Eastern Linear Pottery culture.

In one view, the AVK came "directly out of" the Körös. The brief, short-ranged Szatmár group on the northern edge of the Körös culture seems transitional. Some place it with the Körös, some with the AVK. The latter's pottery is decorated with white painted bands with incised edges. Körös pottery was painted.

As is presented above, however, no major population movements occurred across the border. The Körös went on into a late phase in its accustomed place, 5770–5230. The late Körös is also called the Proto-Vinča, which was succeeded by the Vinča-Tordo, 5390–4960. There is no necessity to view the Körös and the AVK as closely connected. The AVK economy is somewhat different: it used cattle and swine, both of which occur wild in the region, instead of the sheep of the Balkans and Mediterranean. The percentage of wild animal bones is greater. Barley, millet and lentils were added.

Around 5100 or so, towards the end of the Middle Neolithic, the classical AVK descended into a complex of pronounced local groups called the Szakálhát-Esztár-Bükk, which flourished about 5260–4880:

- The Szakálhát group was located on the lower and middle Tisza and the Körös Rivers, taking the place of the previous Körös culture. Its pottery went on with the painted white bands and incised edge.
- The Esztár group to the north featured pottery with bands painted in dark paint.
- The Szilmeg group was located in the foothills of the Bükk.
- The Tiszadob group was located in the Sajó Valley.
- The Bükk culture was located in the mountains.
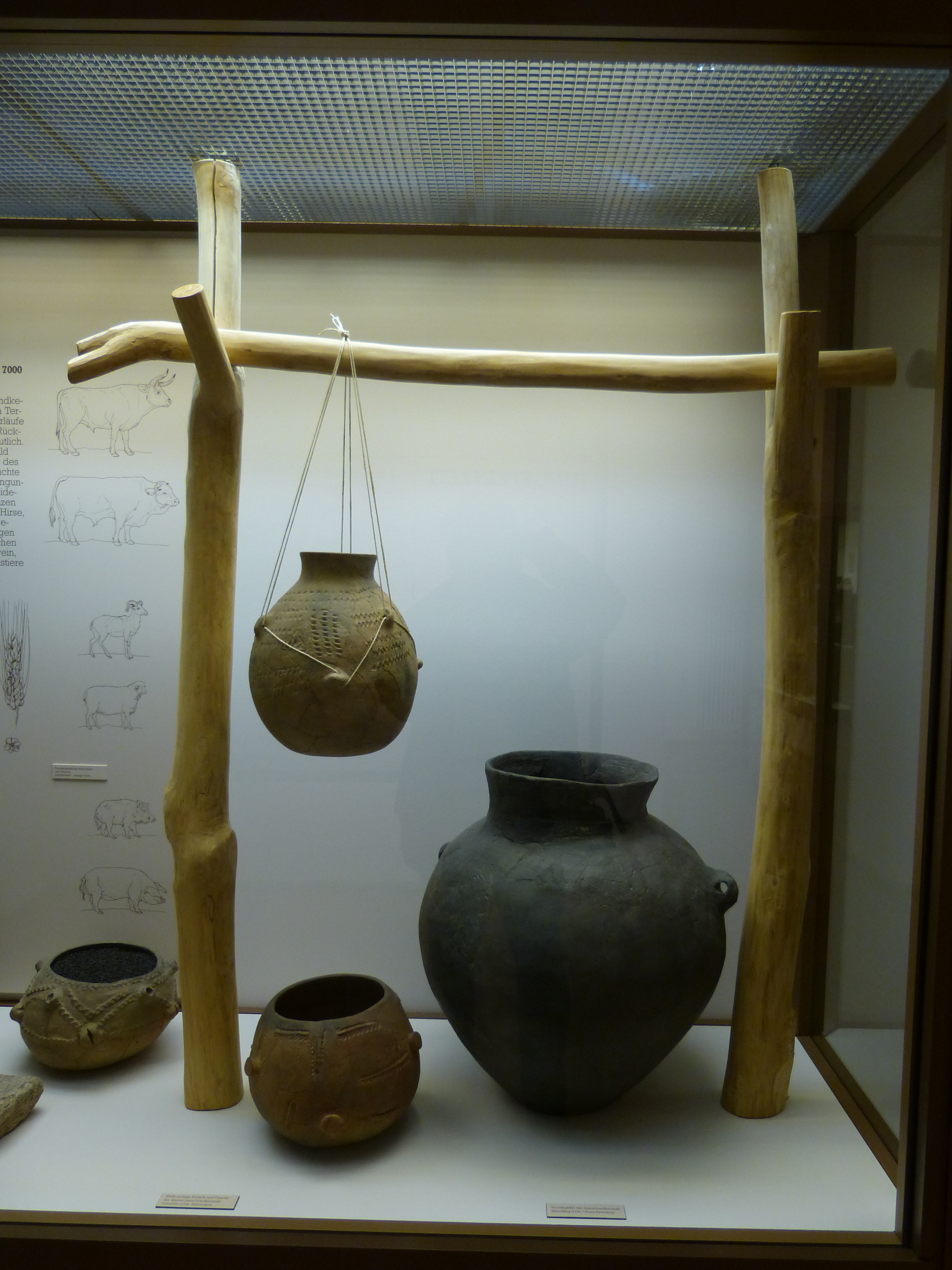
Pottery

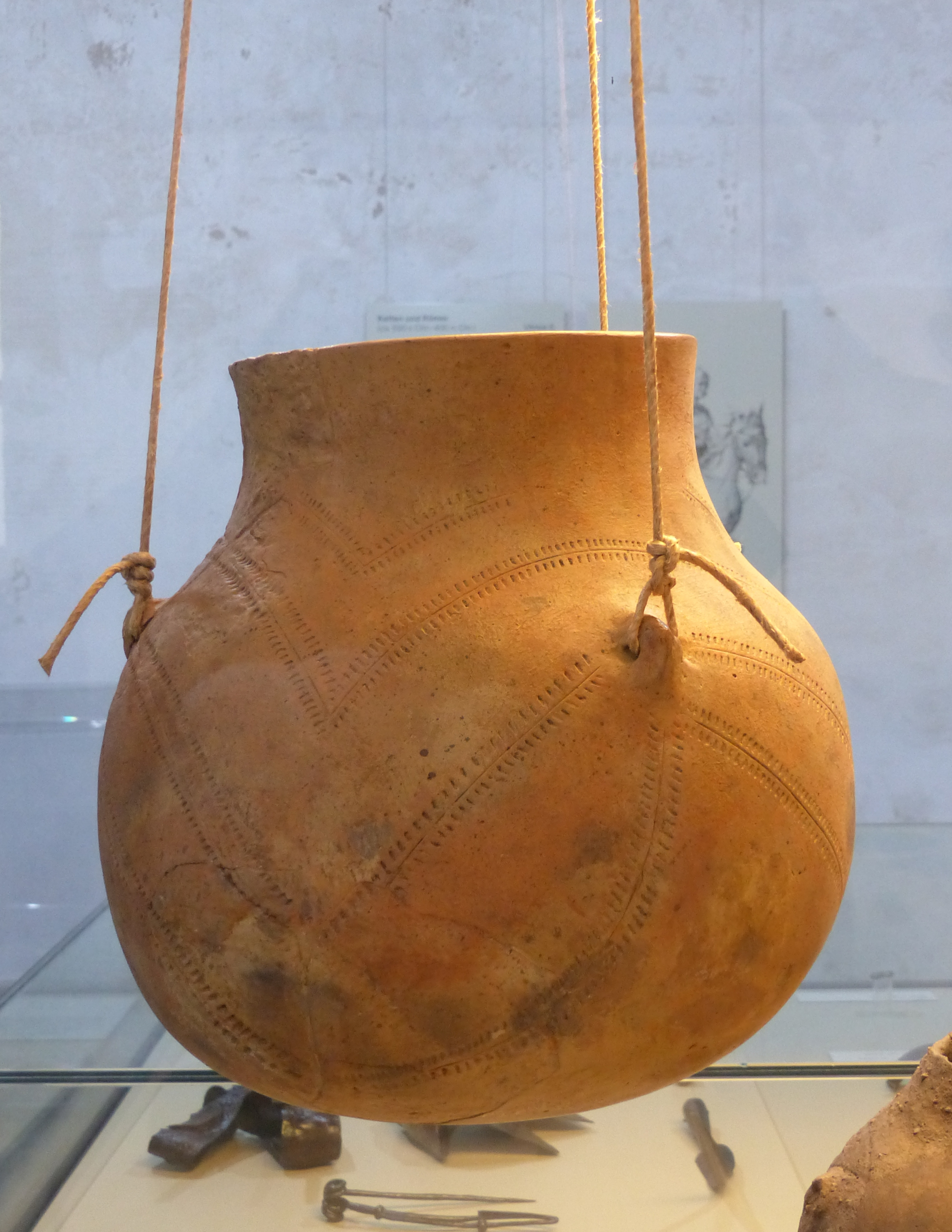
Pottery reconstruction

These are all characterised by finely crafted and decorated ware. The entire group is considered by the majority of the sources listed in this article to have been in the LBK. Before the chronology and many of the sites were known, the Bükk was thought to be a major variant; in fact, Gimbutas at one point believed it to be identical with the Eastern Linear Pottery culture. Since 1991, the predominance of the Alföld has come to light.

The end of the Eastern Linear Pottery culture and the LBK is less certain. The Szakálhát-Esztár-Bükk descended into another Late Neolithic legacy complex, the Tisza-Hérpály-Csöszhalom, which is either not LBK or is transitional from the LBK to the Tiszapolgár culture, a successor culture.

== Origins ==
=== Culture ===
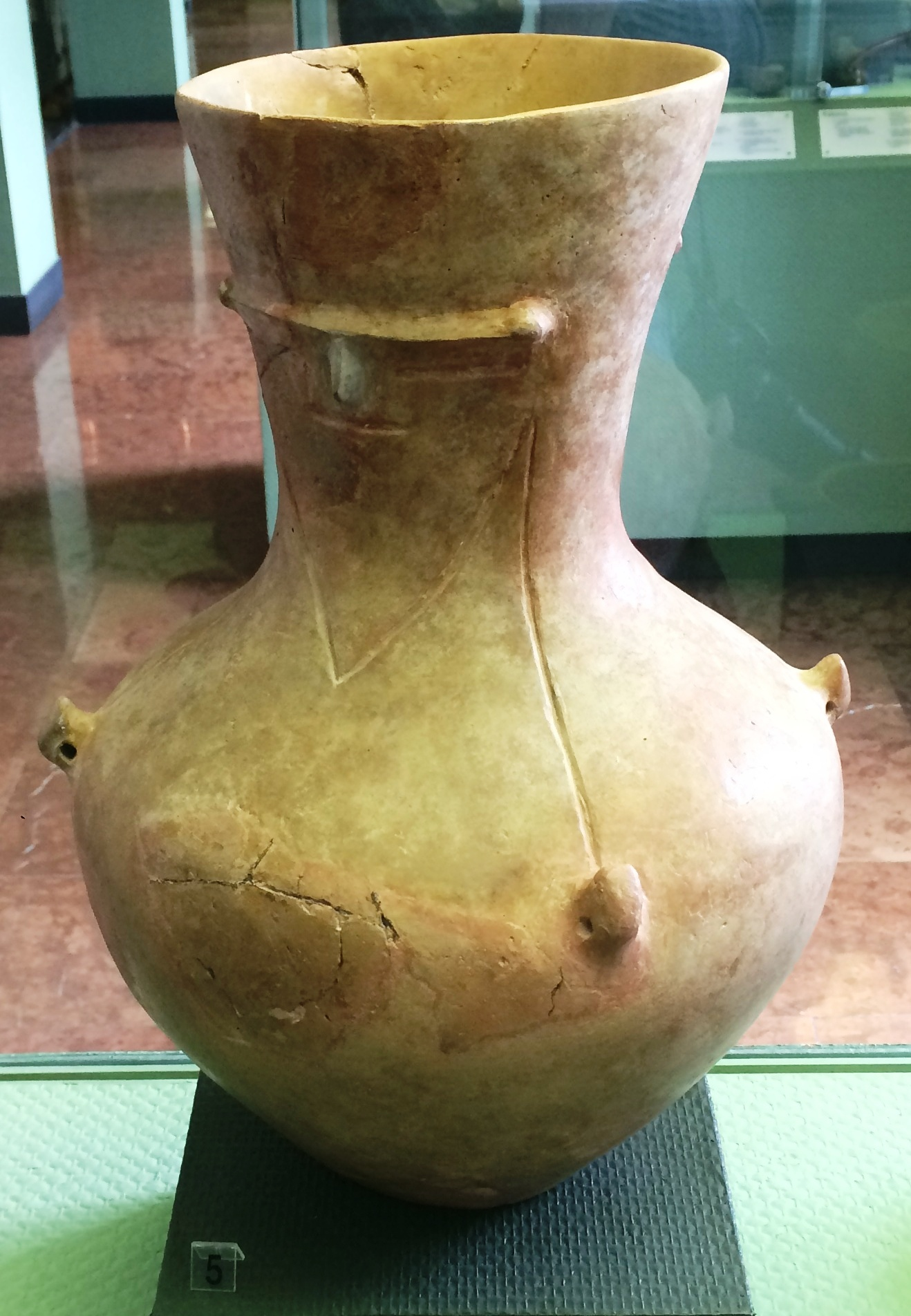
Anthropomorphic vessel.

The earliest theory of Linear Pottery culture origin is that it came from the Starčevo-Körös culture of Serbia and Hungary. Supporting this view is the fact that the LBK appeared earliest about 5600–5400 BC on the middle Danube in the Starčevo range. Presumably, the expansion northwards of early Starčevo-Körös produced a local variant reaching the upper Tisza that may have well been created by contact with local Epipalaeolithic peoples. This small group began a new tradition of pottery, substituting engravings for the paintings of the Balkanic cultures.

A site at Brunn am Gebirge just south of Vienna seems to document the transition to LBK. The site was densely settled in a long house pattern around 5550–5200. The lower layers feature Starčevo-type plain pottery, with large number of stone tools made of material from near Lake Balaton, Hungary. Over the time frame, LBK pottery and animal husbandry increased, while the use of stone tools decreased.

A second theory proposes an autochthonous development out of the local Mesolithic cultures. Although the Starčevo-Körös entered southern Hungary about 6000 BC and the LBK spread very rapidly, there appears to be a hiatus of up to 500 years in which a barrier seems to have been in effect. Moreover, the cultivated species of the near and middle eastern Neolithic do not do well over the Linear Pottery culture range. And finally, the Mesolithics in the region prior to the LBK used some domestic species, such as wheat and flax. The La Hoguette culture on the northwest of the LBK range developed their own food production from native plants and animals.

A third theory attributes Linear Pottery culture to be a product of influence from the south eastern European steppe (such as Yelshanian sites in the Lower Volga-Ural Interfluve as well as Rakushechnyi Yar and related sites in the Lower Don area). Using radiocarbon dating, and assuming a geographic spread from Transdanubia to the Paris Basin, according to Dolukhanov et al. the LBK culture spread 4-6 times faster than the spread of the European Neolithic in general.

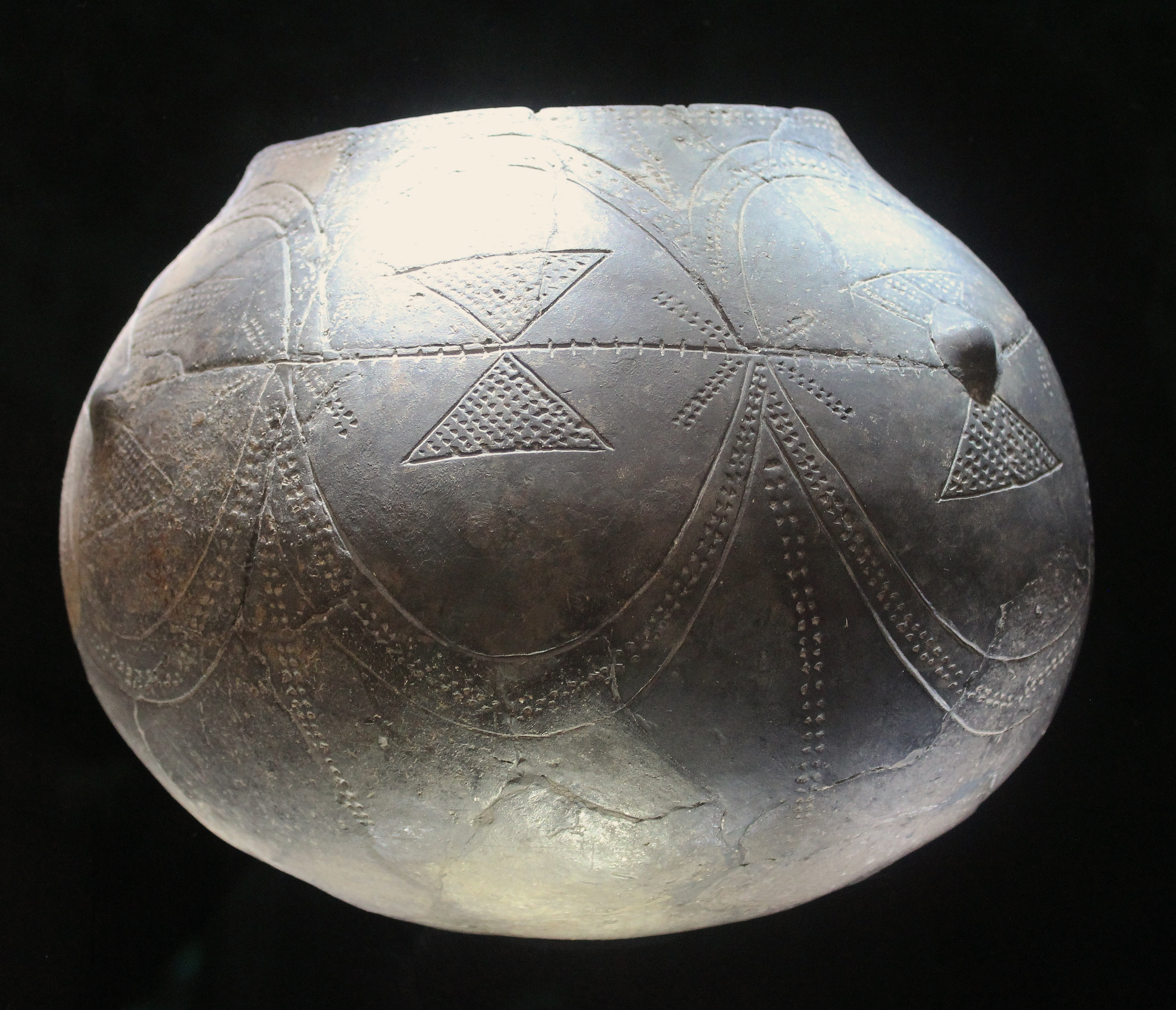
Pottery

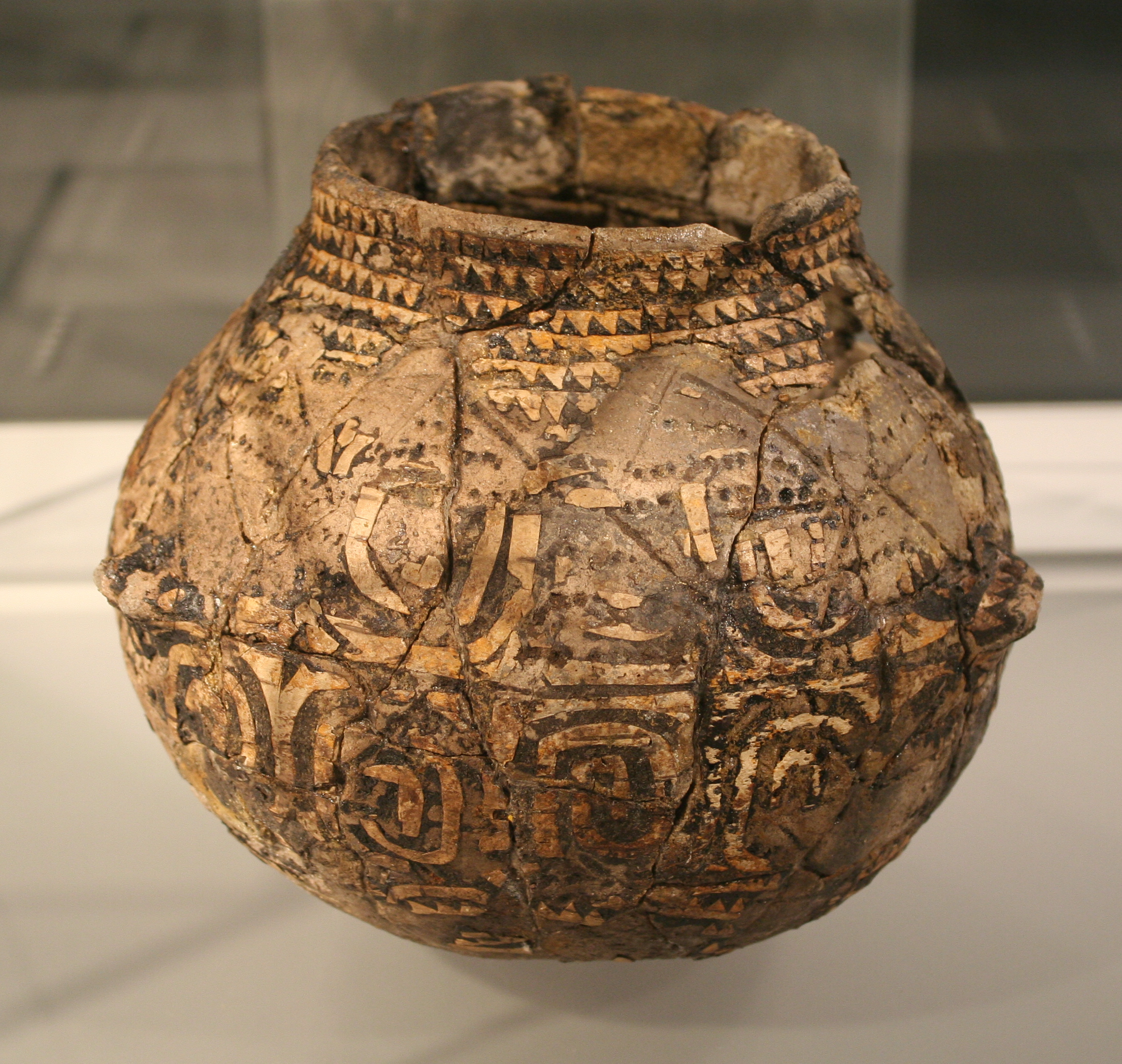
Pottery

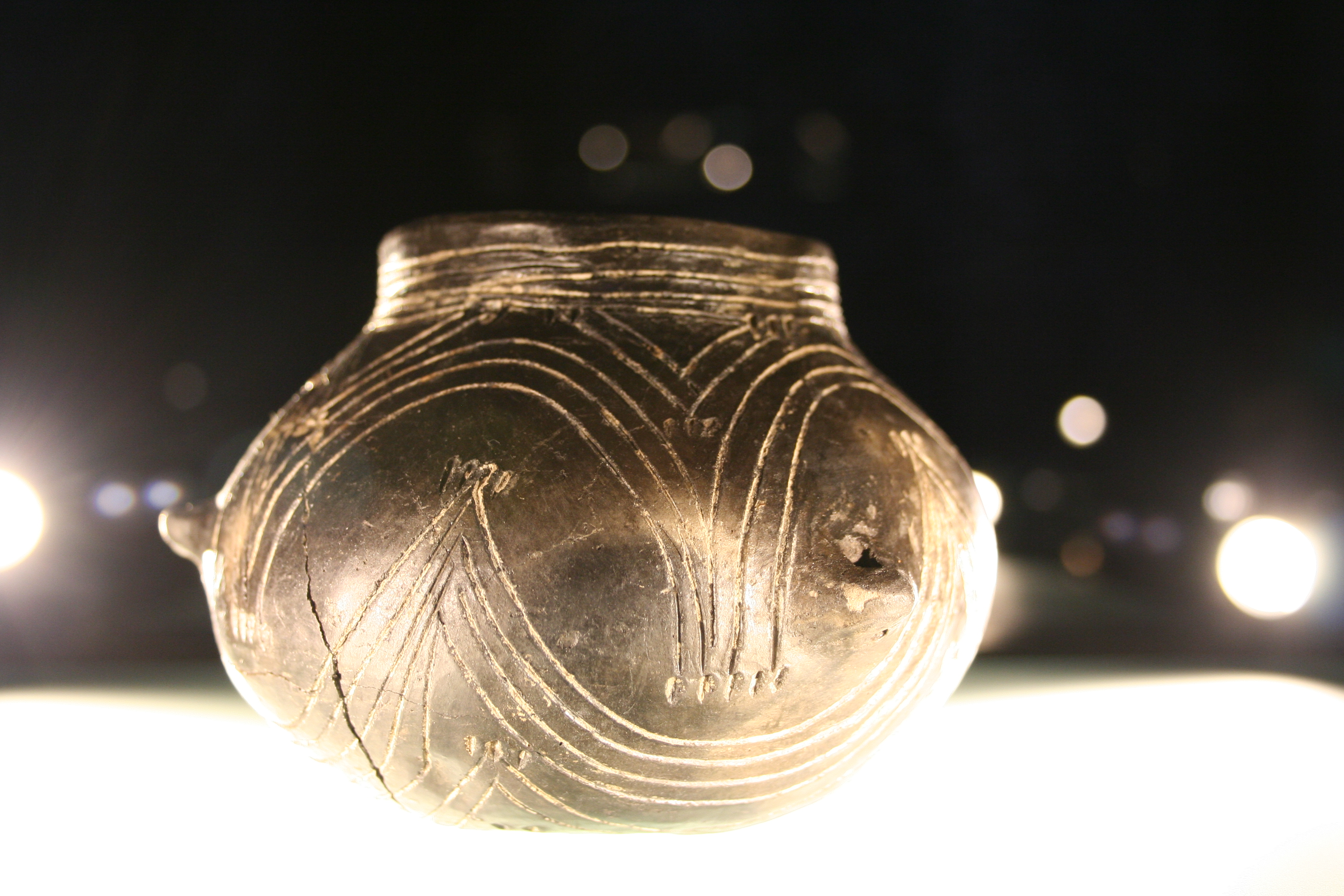
Pottery

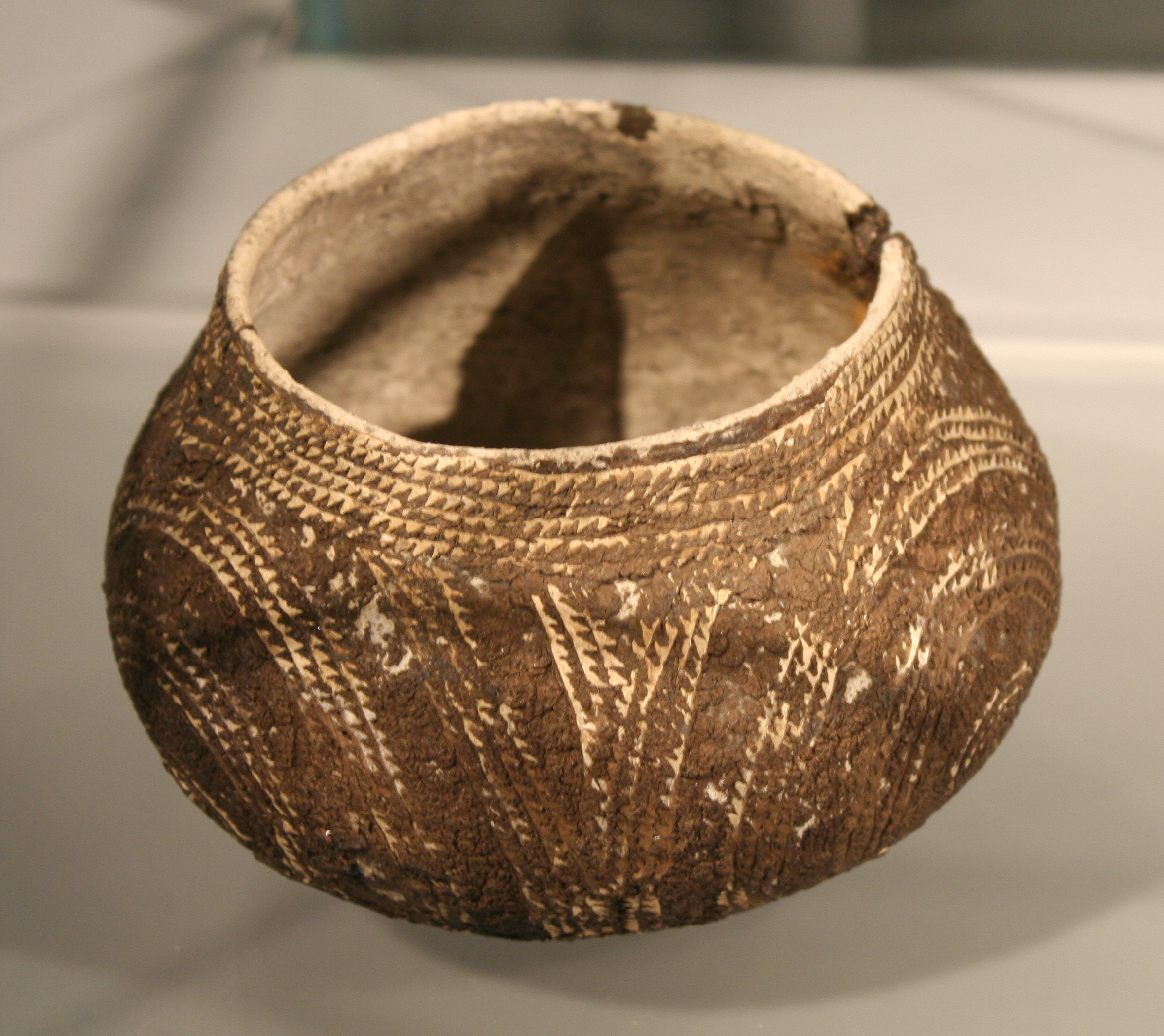
Pottery

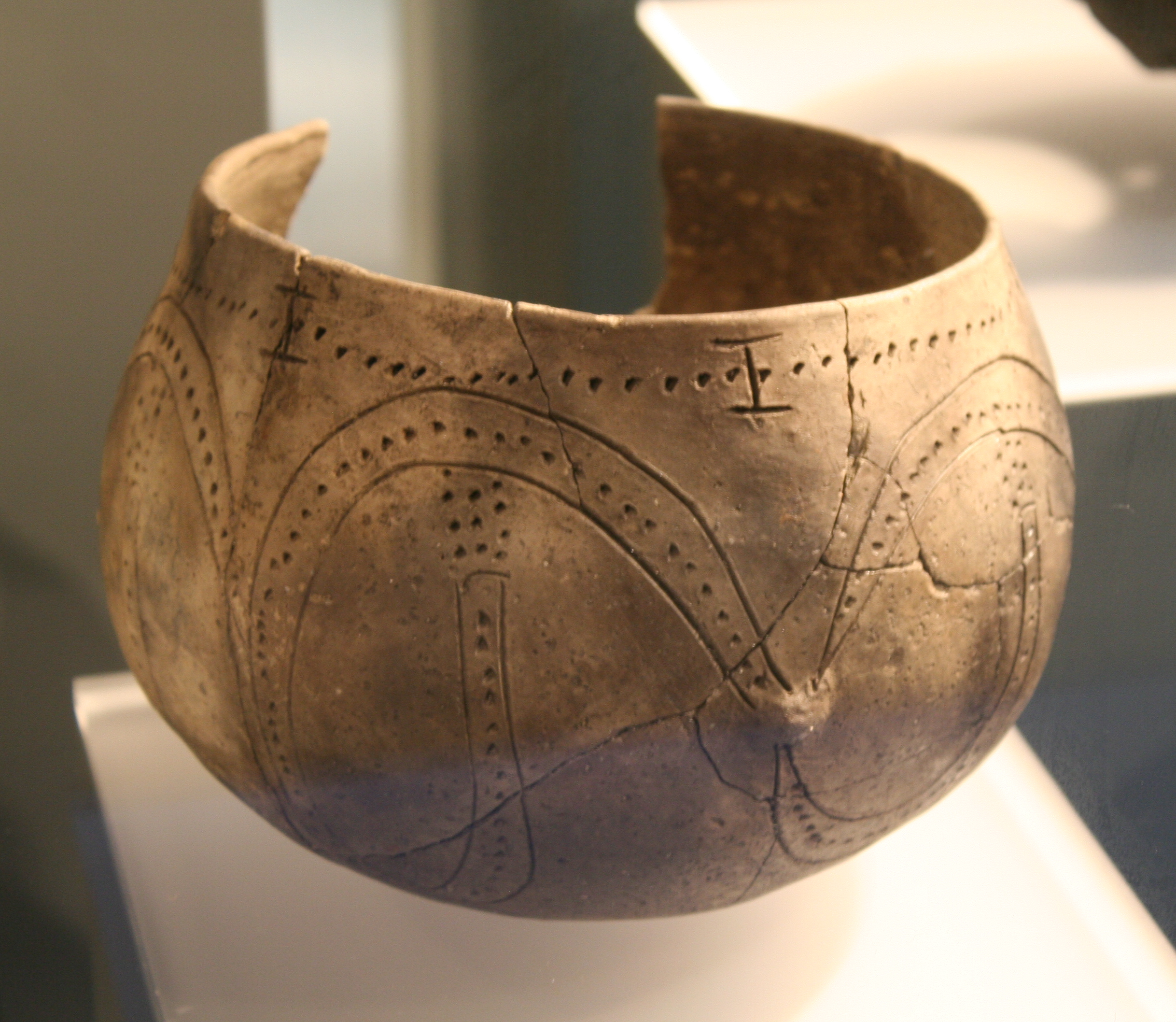
Pottery

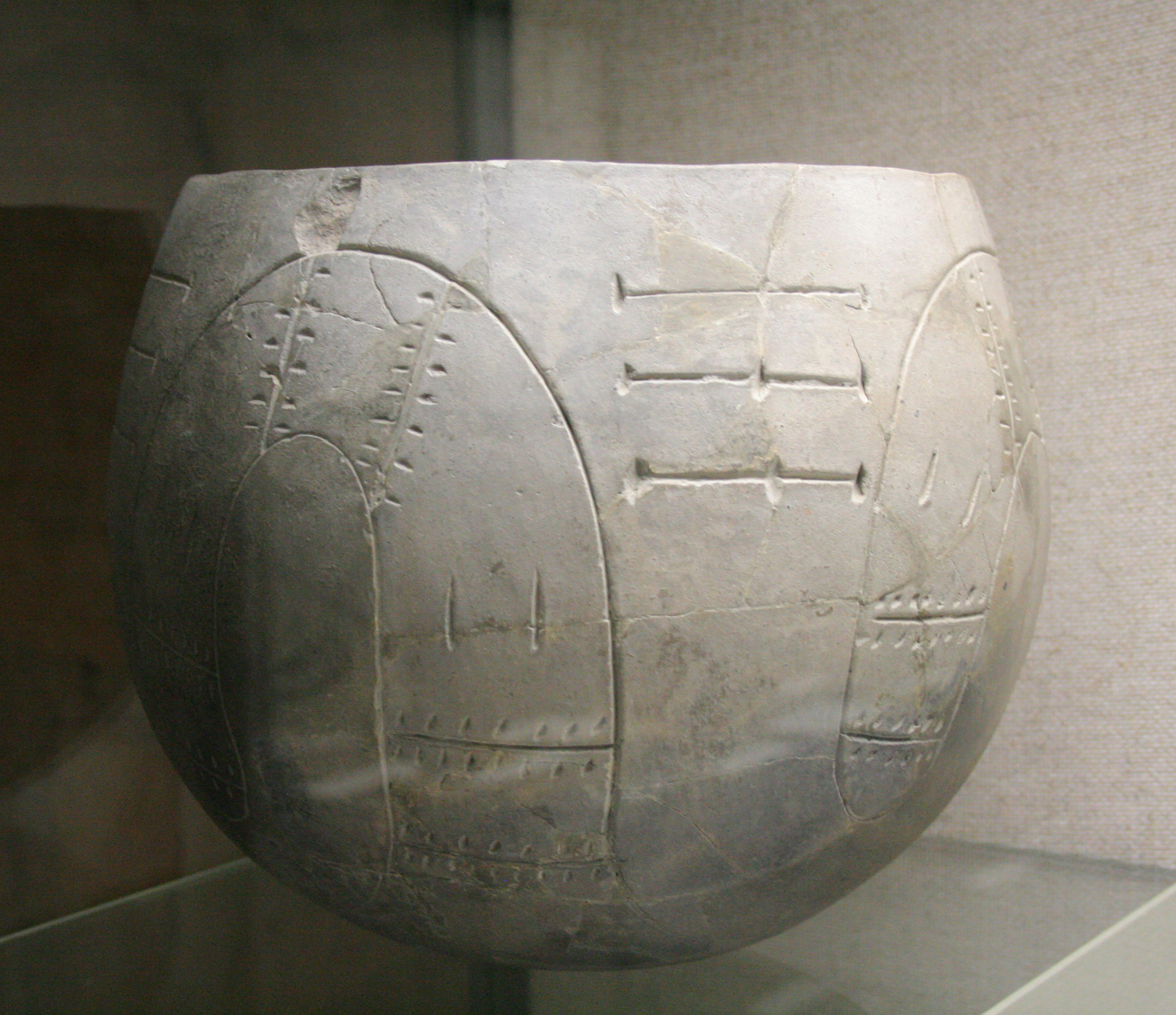
Pottery

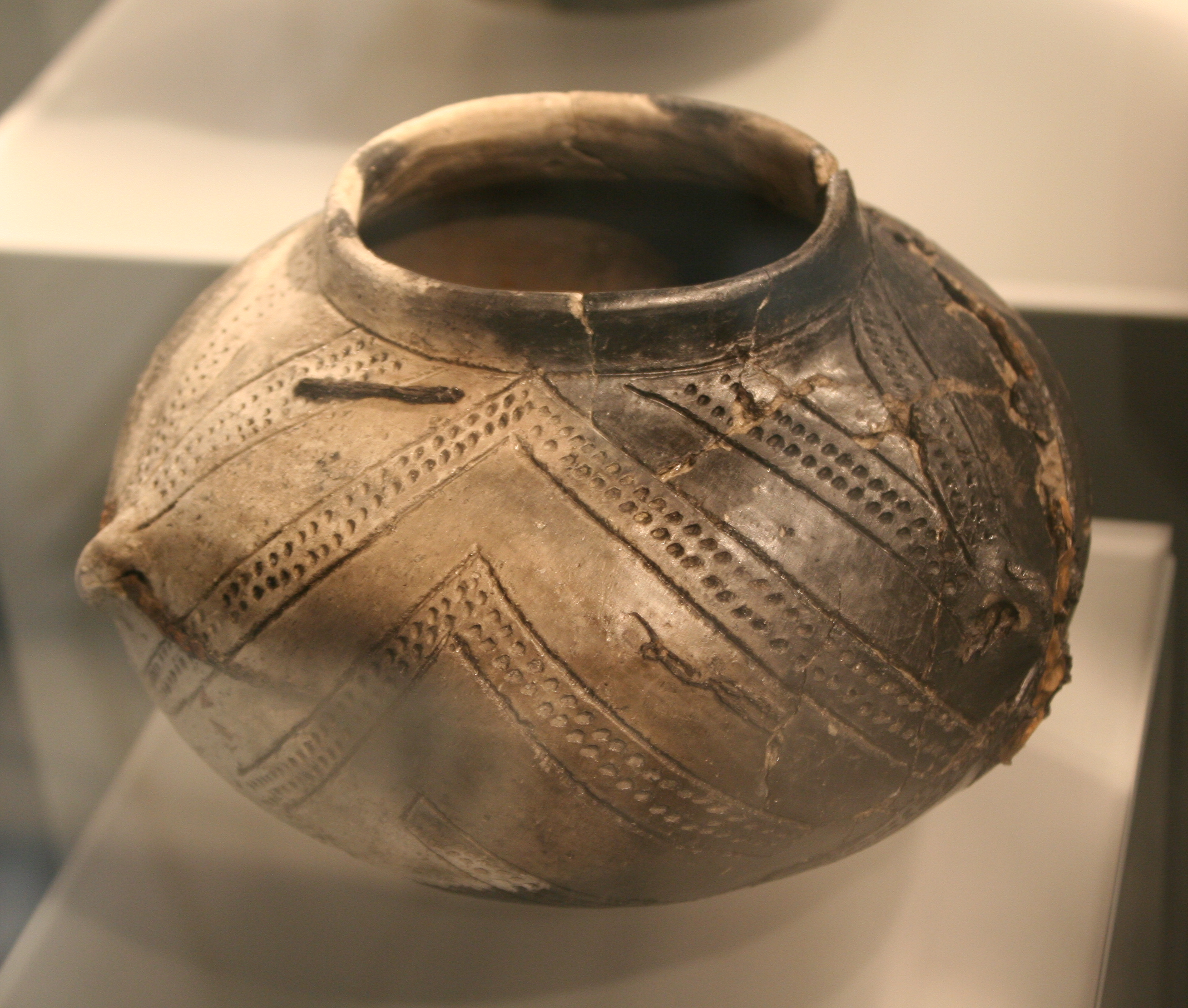
Pottery

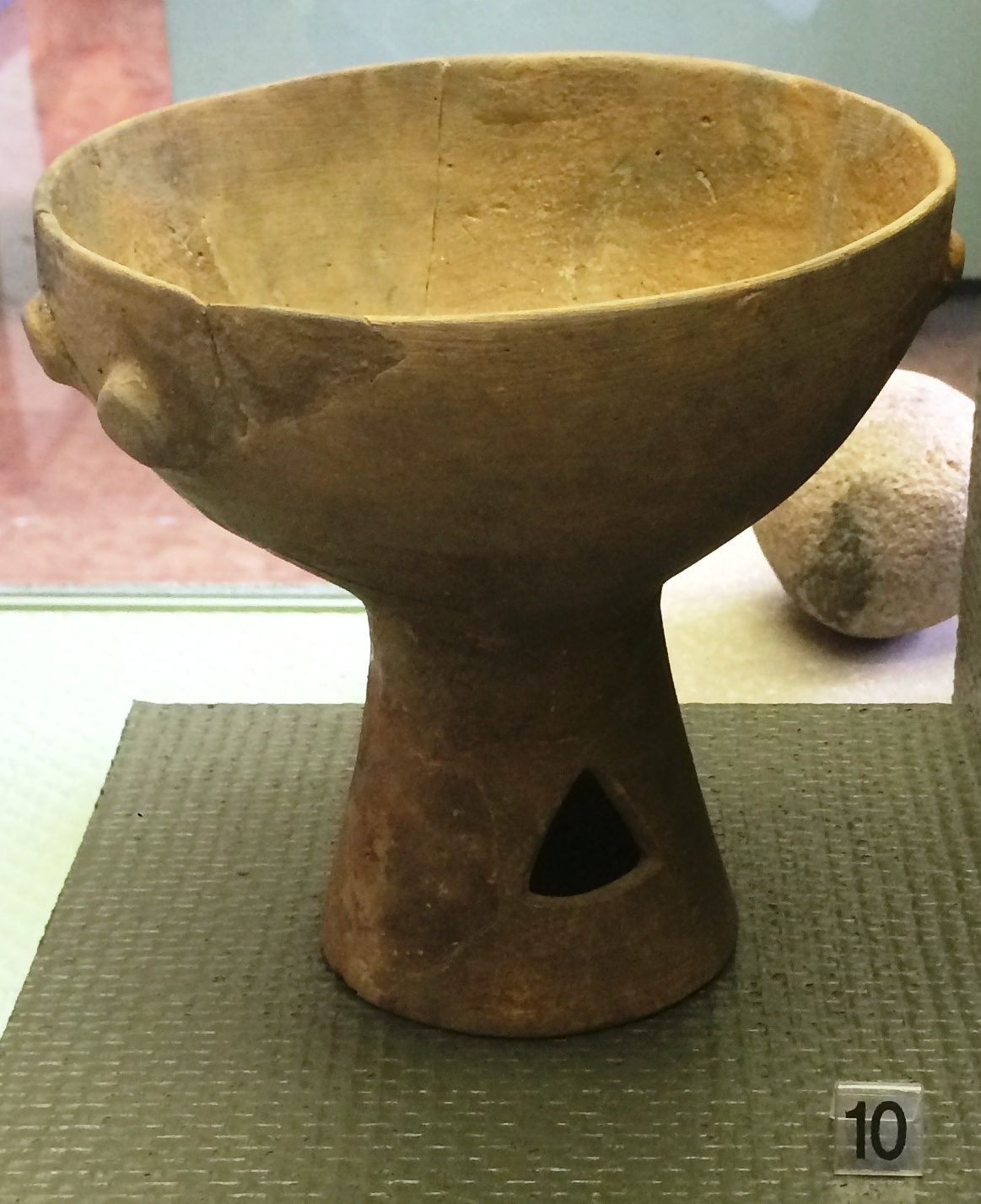
Pedestal bowl

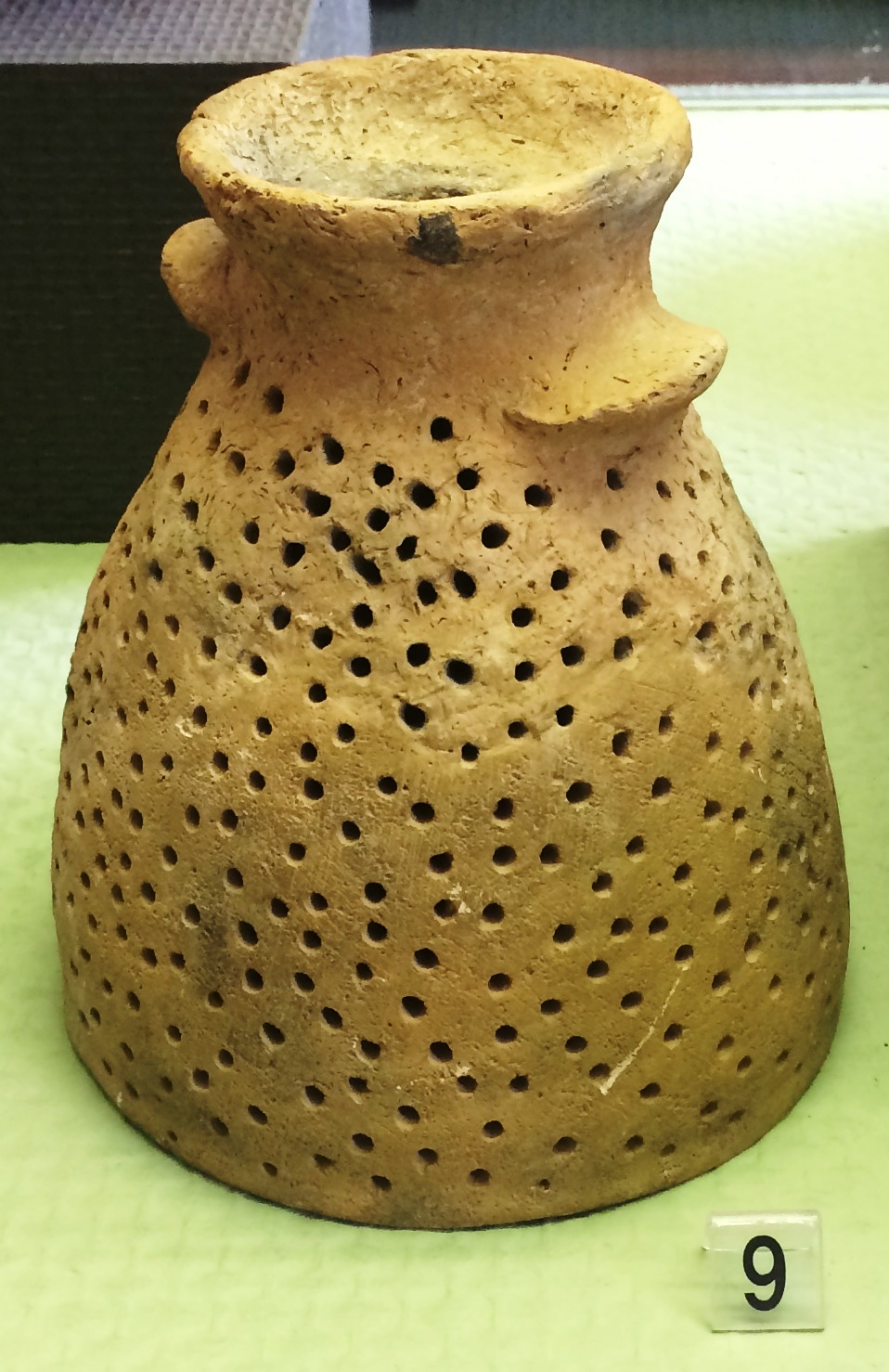
Pottery

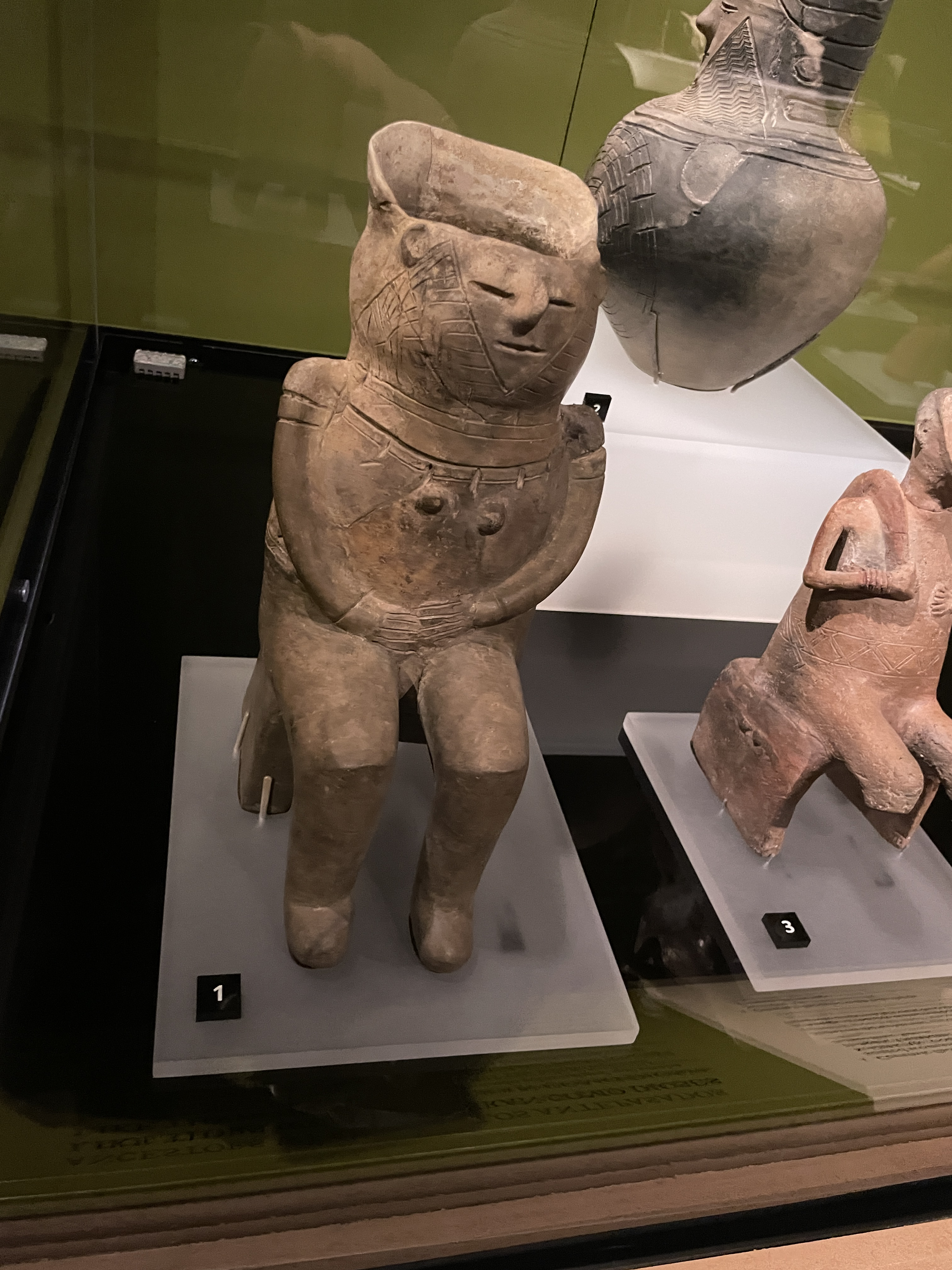
Anthropomorphic vessel

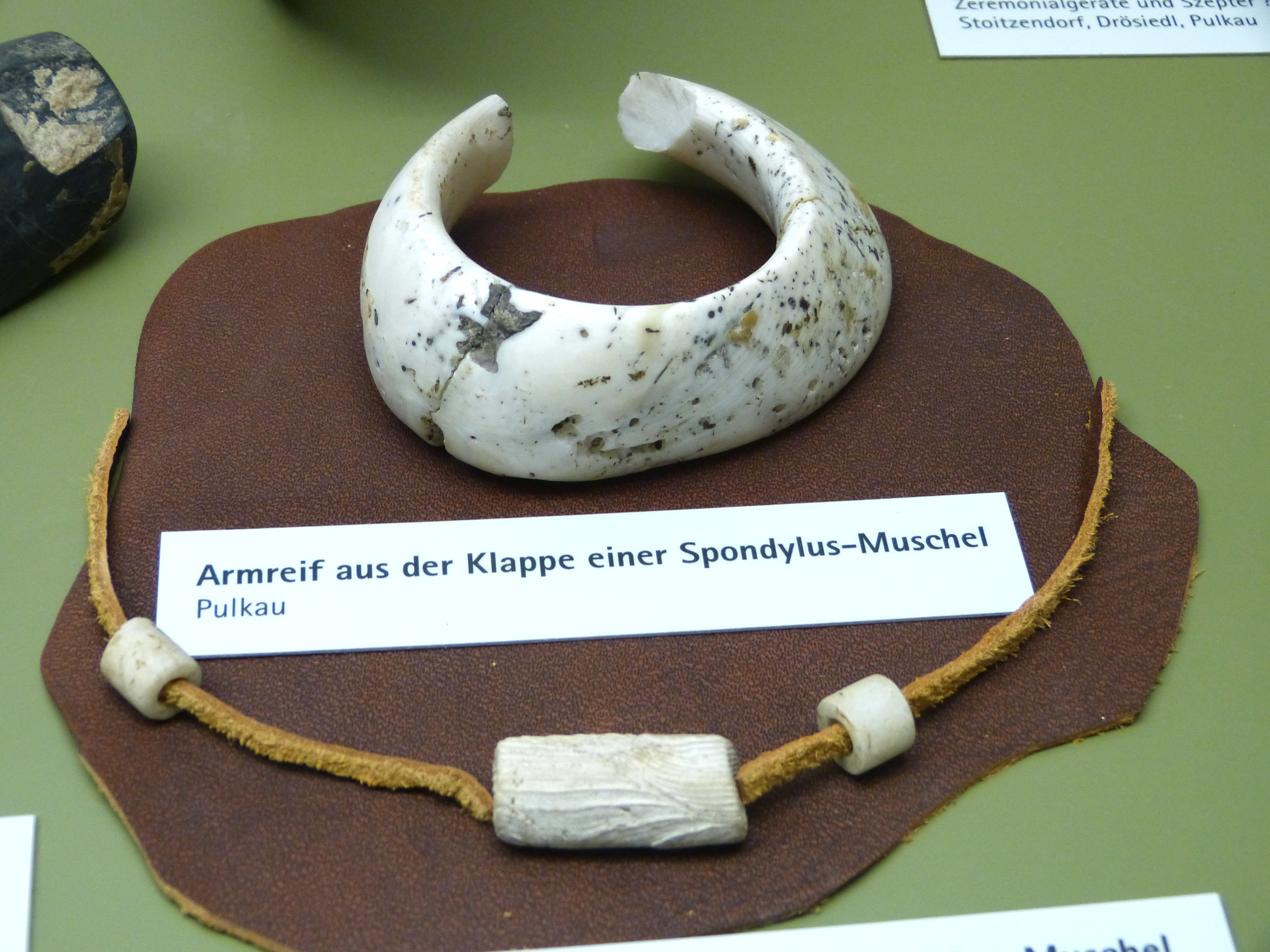
Spondylus shell bracelet

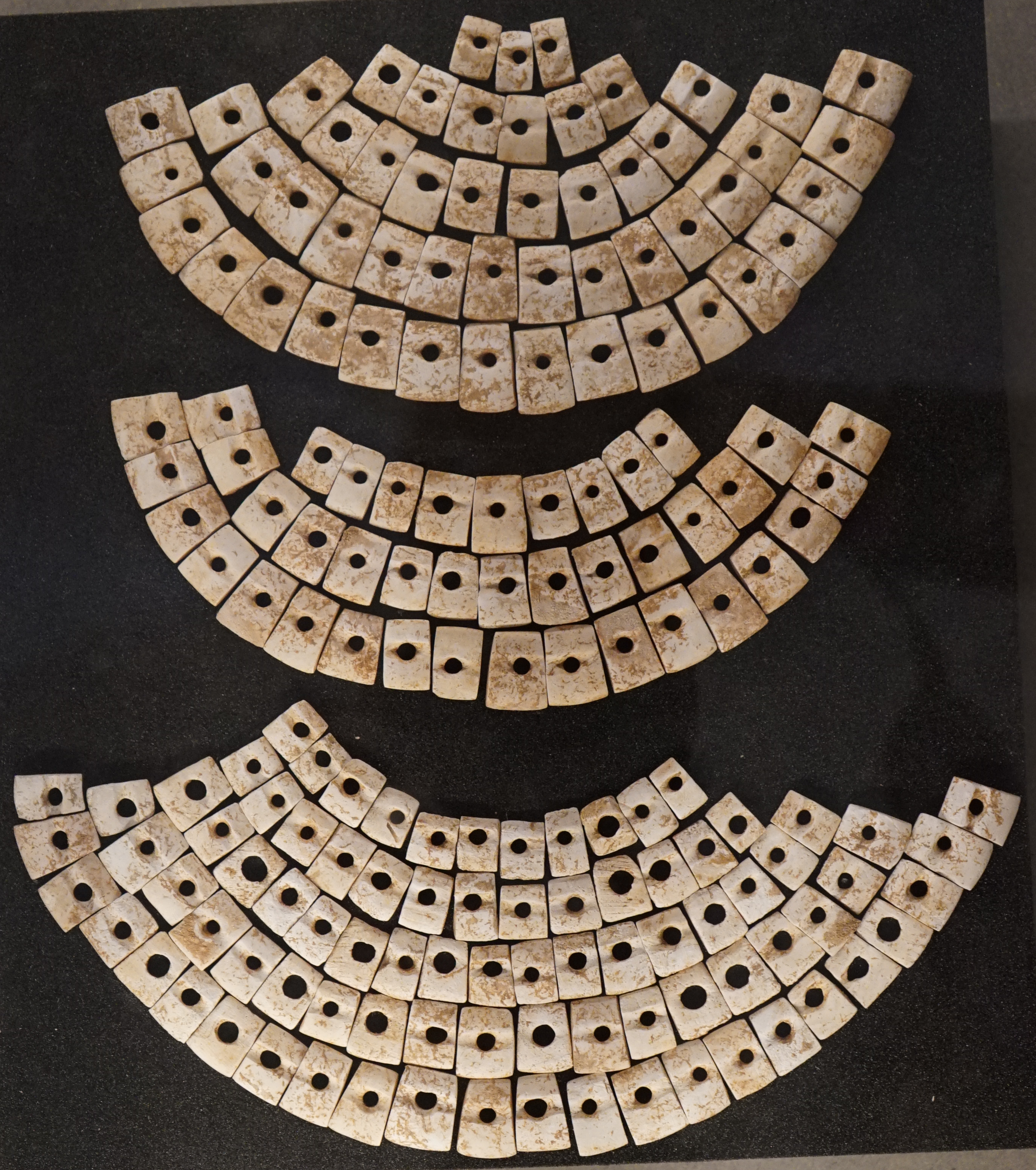
Shell jewellery

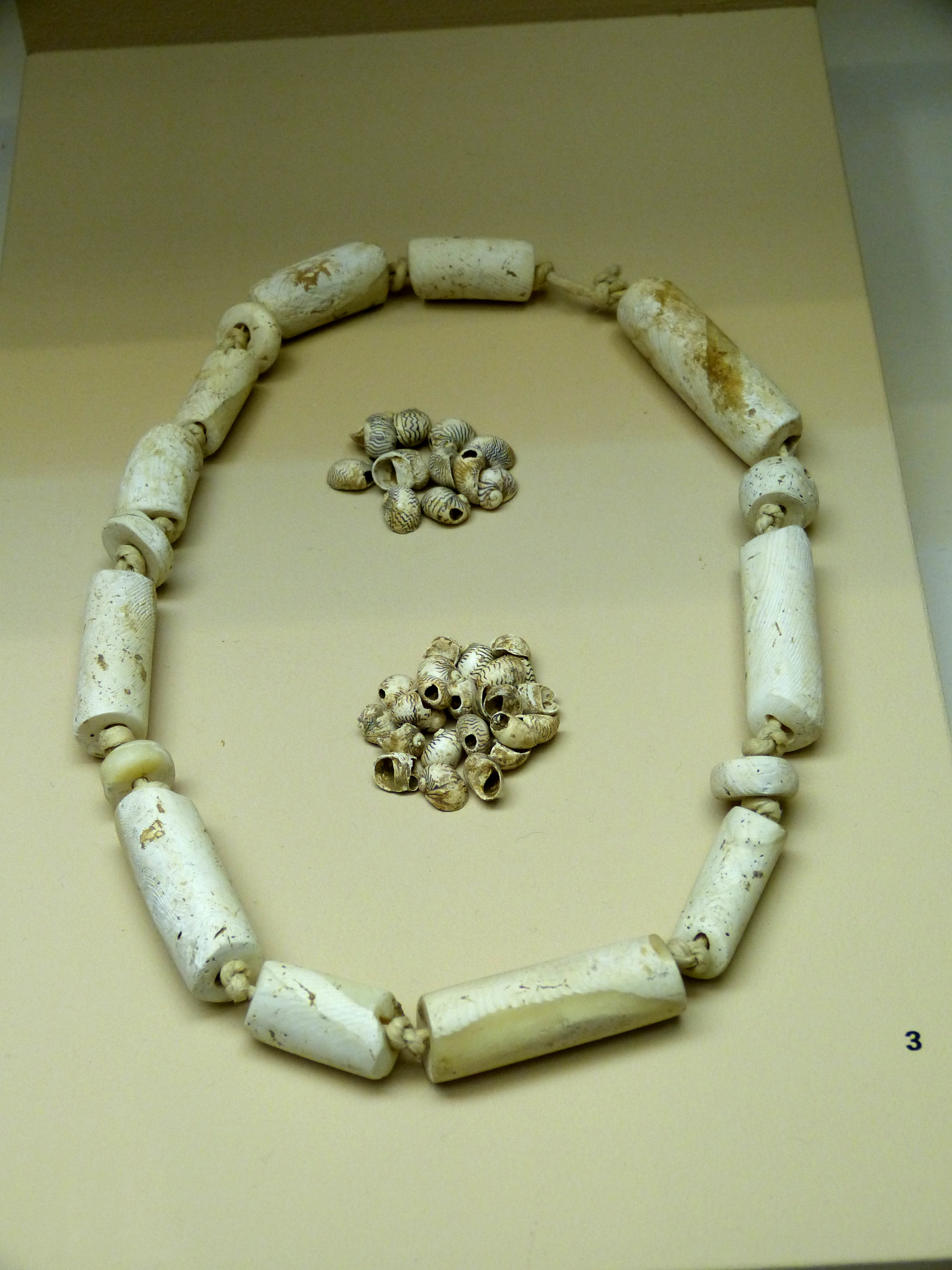
Bone and shell jewellery

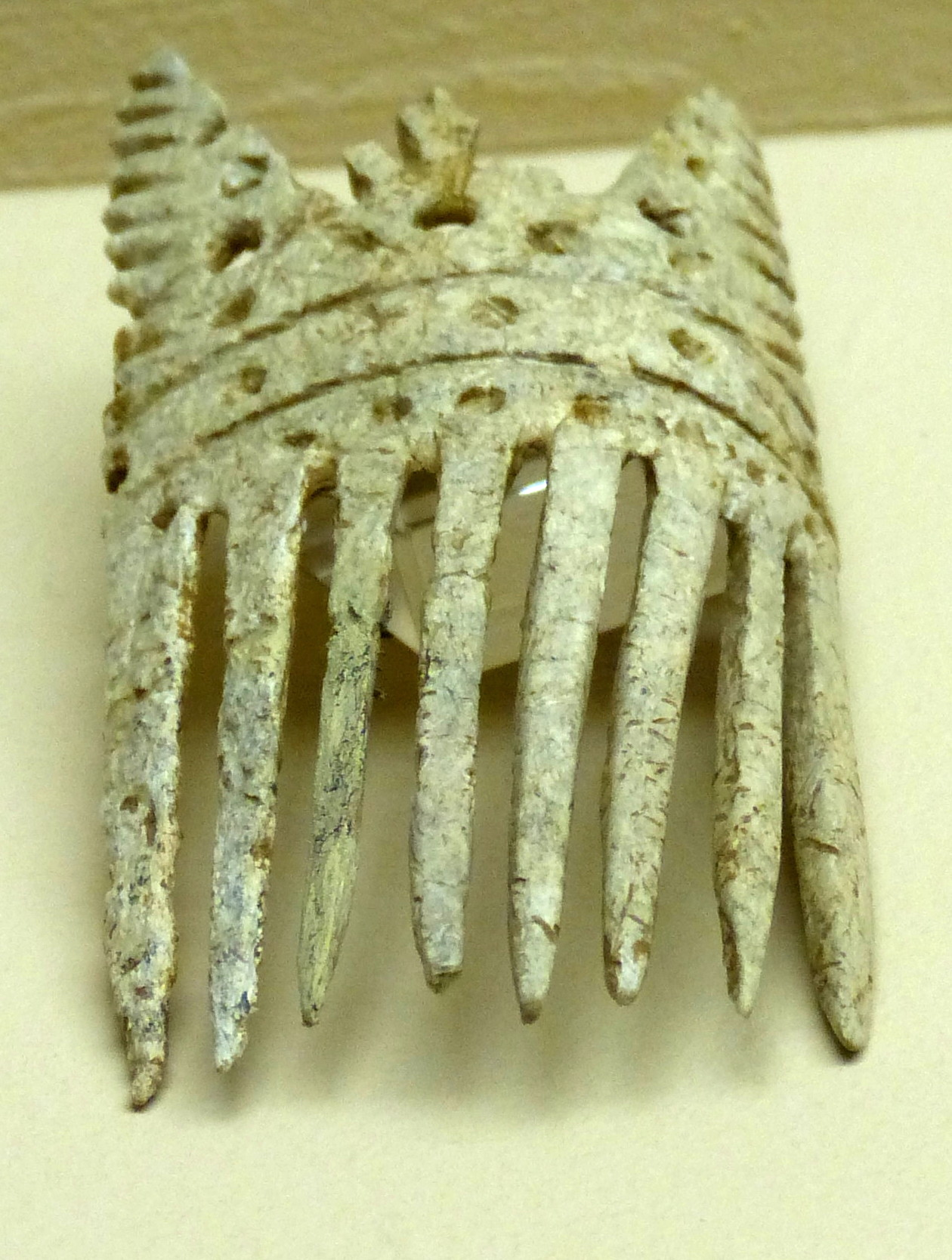
Bone comb

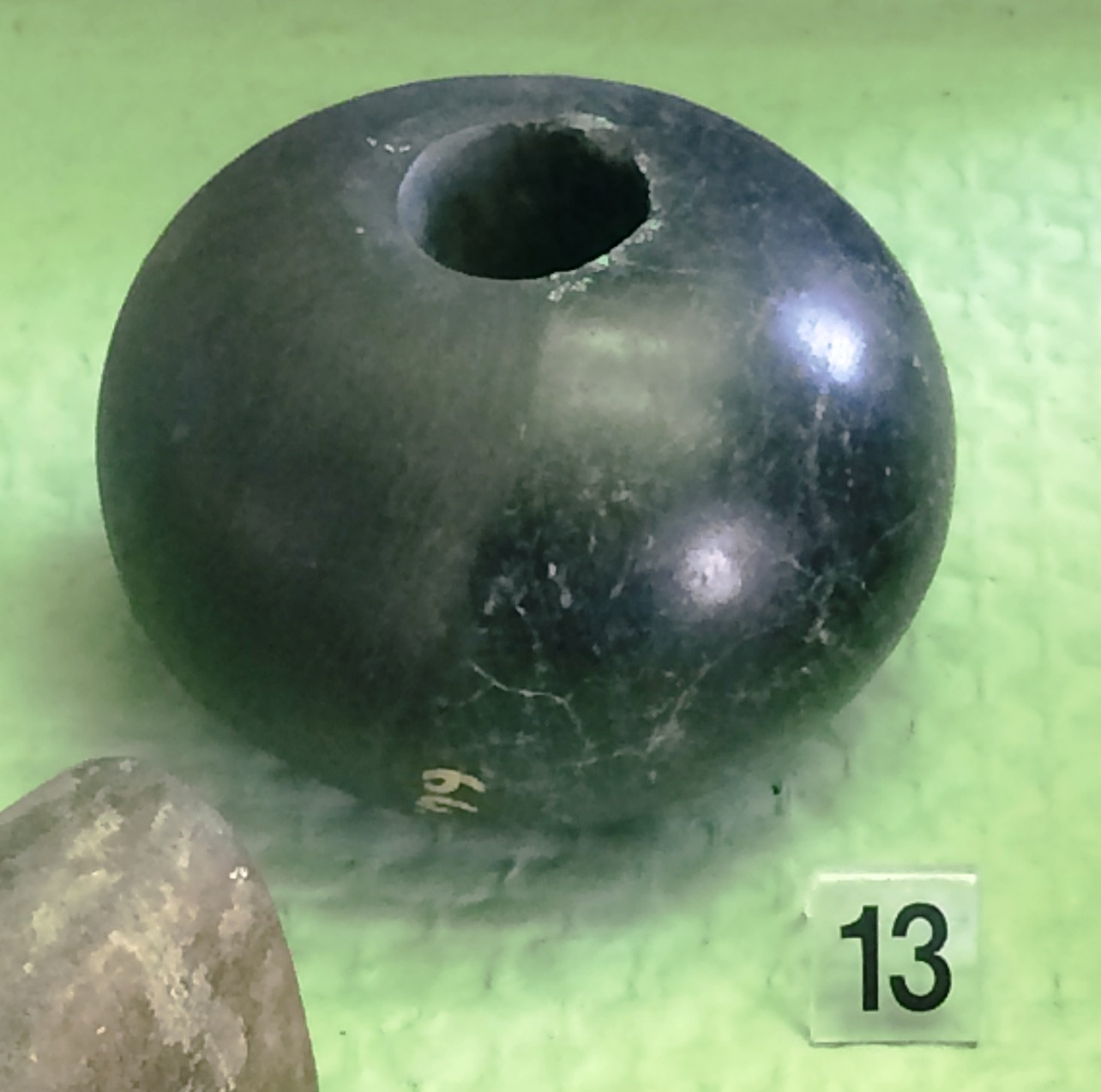
Stone mace head

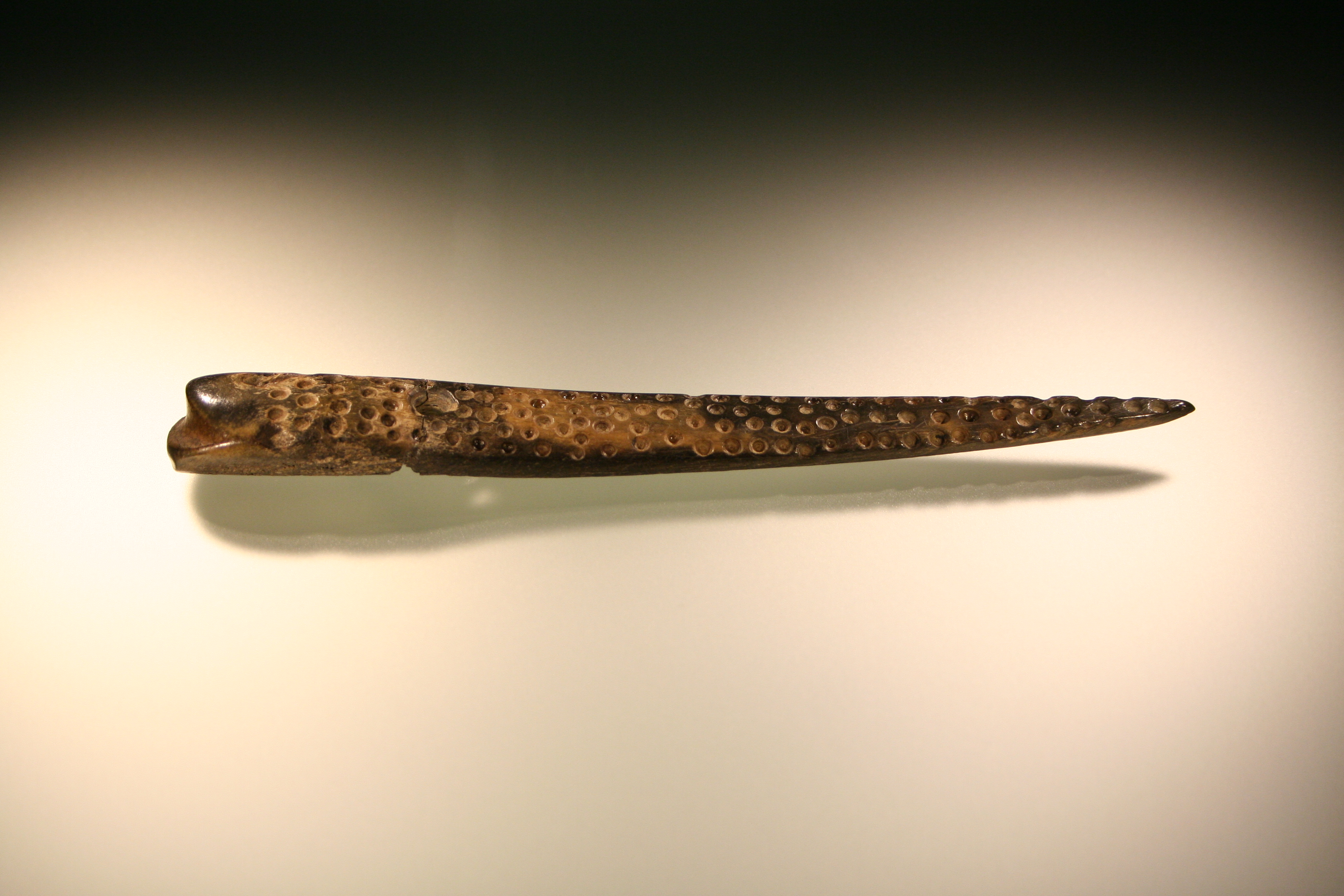
Decorated bone tip

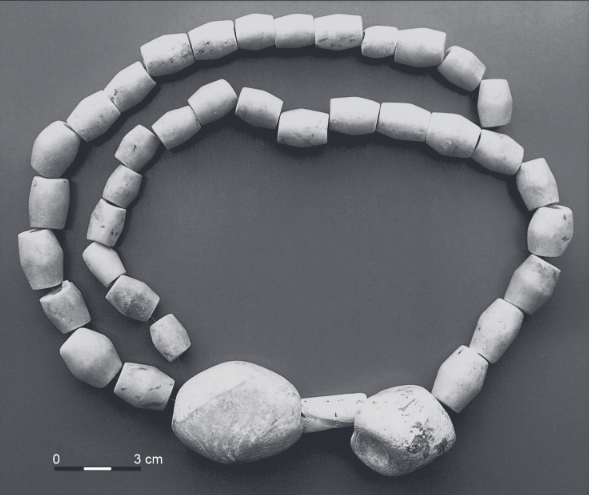
Necklace made from spondylus shell and white marble, Poland

=== Population ===
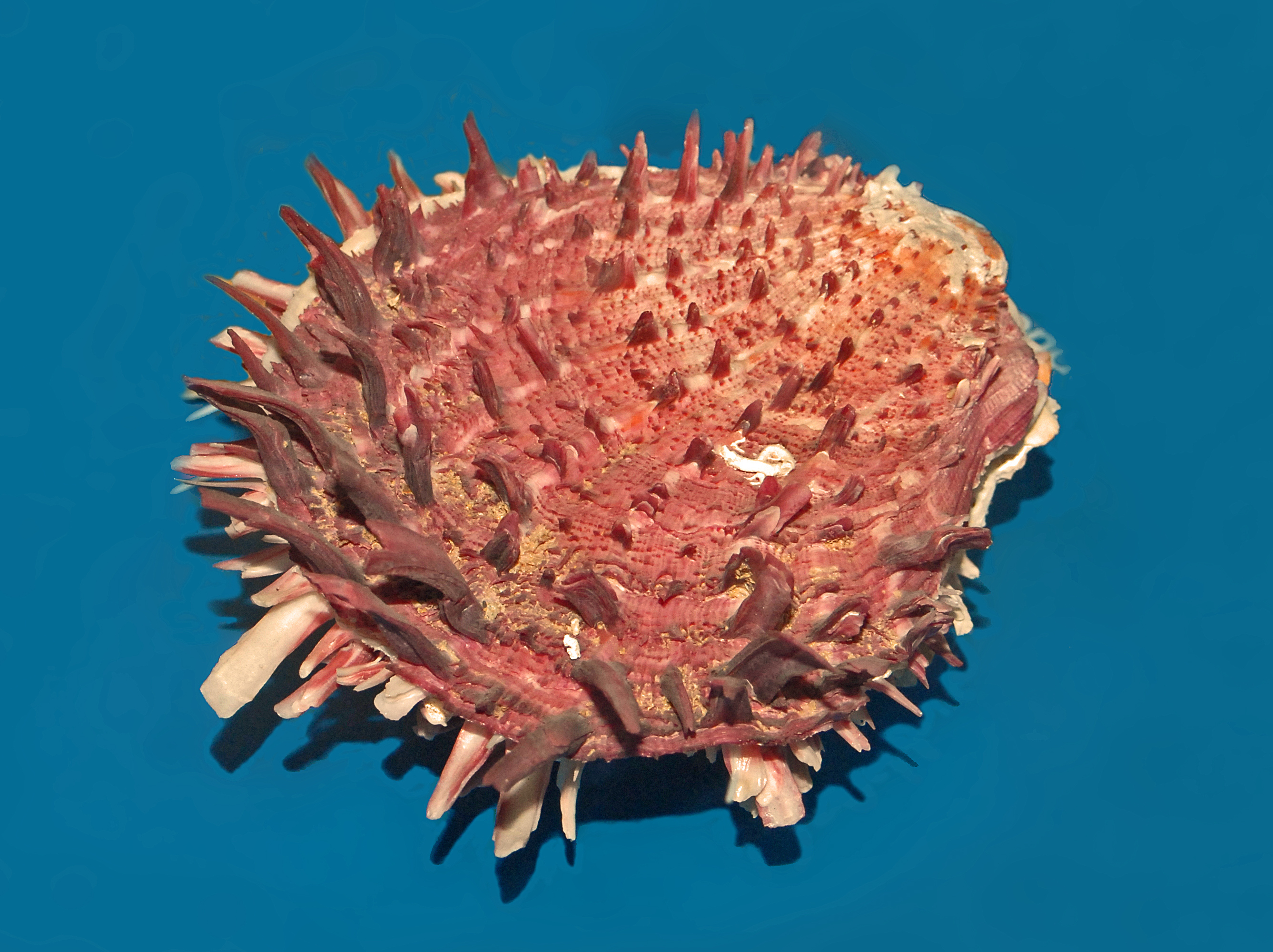
A shell of the edible mollusc Spondylus gaederopus, on display at the Museo Civico di Storia Naturale di Milano

The initial LBK population theory hypothesized that the culture was spread by farmers moving up the Danube practicing slash-and-burn methods. The presence of the Mediterranean sea shell, Spondylus gaederopus, and the similarity of the pottery to gourds, which did not grow in the north, seemed to be evidence of the immigration, as does the genetic evidence cited below. The lands into which they moved were believed untenanted or too sparsely populated by hunter-gatherers to be a significant factor.

=== Genetic evidence ===
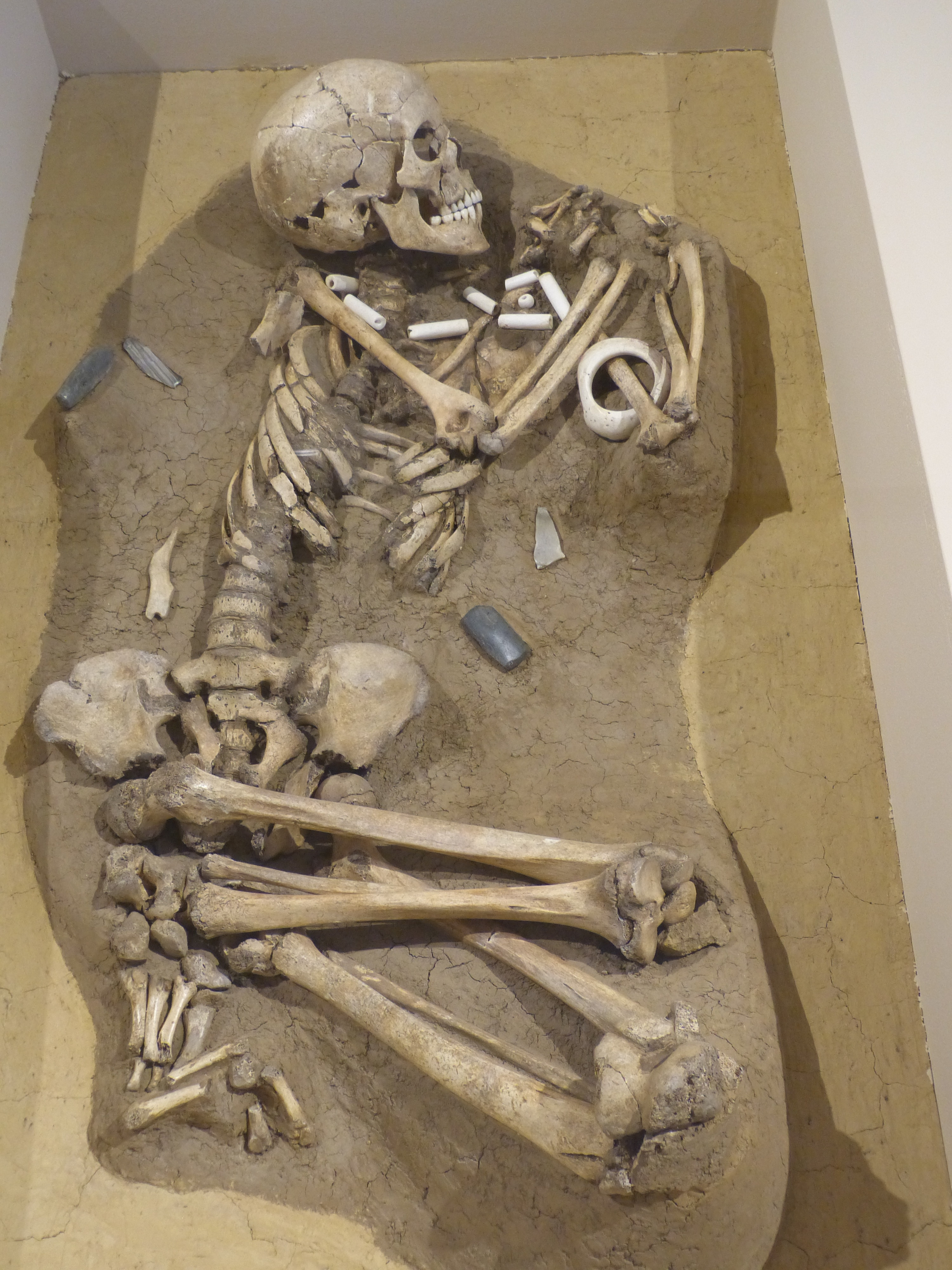
Linear band ceramic culture burial site (Grave 41 site)

In 2005, scientists successfully sequenced mtDNA coding region 15997–16409 derived from twenty-four 7,500- to 7,000-year-old human remains associated with the LBK culture. Of those remains, 22 were from locations in Germany near the Harz Mountains and the upper Rhine Valley, while one was from Austria and one from Hungary. The scientists did not reveal the detailed hypervariable segment I (HVSI) sequences for all the samples, but identified that seven of the samples belonged to H or V branch of the mtDNA phylogenetic tree, six belonged to the N1a branch, five belonged to the T branch, four belonged to the K(U8) branch, one belonged to the J branch, and one belonged to the U3 branch. All branches are extant in the current European population, although the K branch was present in roughly twice the percentages as would be found in Europe today (15% vs. 8% now.).

Comparison of the N1a HVSI sequences with sequences of living individuals found three of them to correspond with those of individuals currently living in Europe. Two of the sequences corresponded to ancestral nodes predicted to exist or to have existed on the European branch of the phylogenetic tree. One of the sequences is related to European populations, but with no apparent descendants amongst the modern population. The N1a evidence supports the notion that the descendants of LBK culture have lived in Europe for more than 7,000 years and have become an integral part of the current European population. The lack of mtDNA haplogroup U5 supports the notion that U5 at this time is uniquely associated with Mesolithic European cultures.

A 2010 study of ancient DNA suggested the LBK population had affinities to modern-day populations from the Near East and Anatolia, such as an overall prevalence of G2. The study also found some unique features, such as the prevalence of the now-rare Y-haplogroup H2 and mitochondrial haplogroup frequencies. However subsequent studies based on full-genome analysis have found that the LBK population was similar genetically to modern southern Europeans, and did not resemble modern Near Eastern or Anatolian populations. Neolithic Anatolian farmers have also been found to be more similar to modern southern Europeans than to modern Near Easterners or Anatolians.

Lipson et al. (2017) and Narasimhan et al. (2019) analyzed a large number of skeletons ascribed to the Linear Pottery Culture. Most of the Y-DNA belonged to G2a and subclades of it, some to I2 and subclades of it, beside few samples of T1a, CT, and C1a2. The samples of mtDNA extracted were various subclades of T, H, N, U, K, J, X, HV, and V.

== Economy ==
=== Land use ===
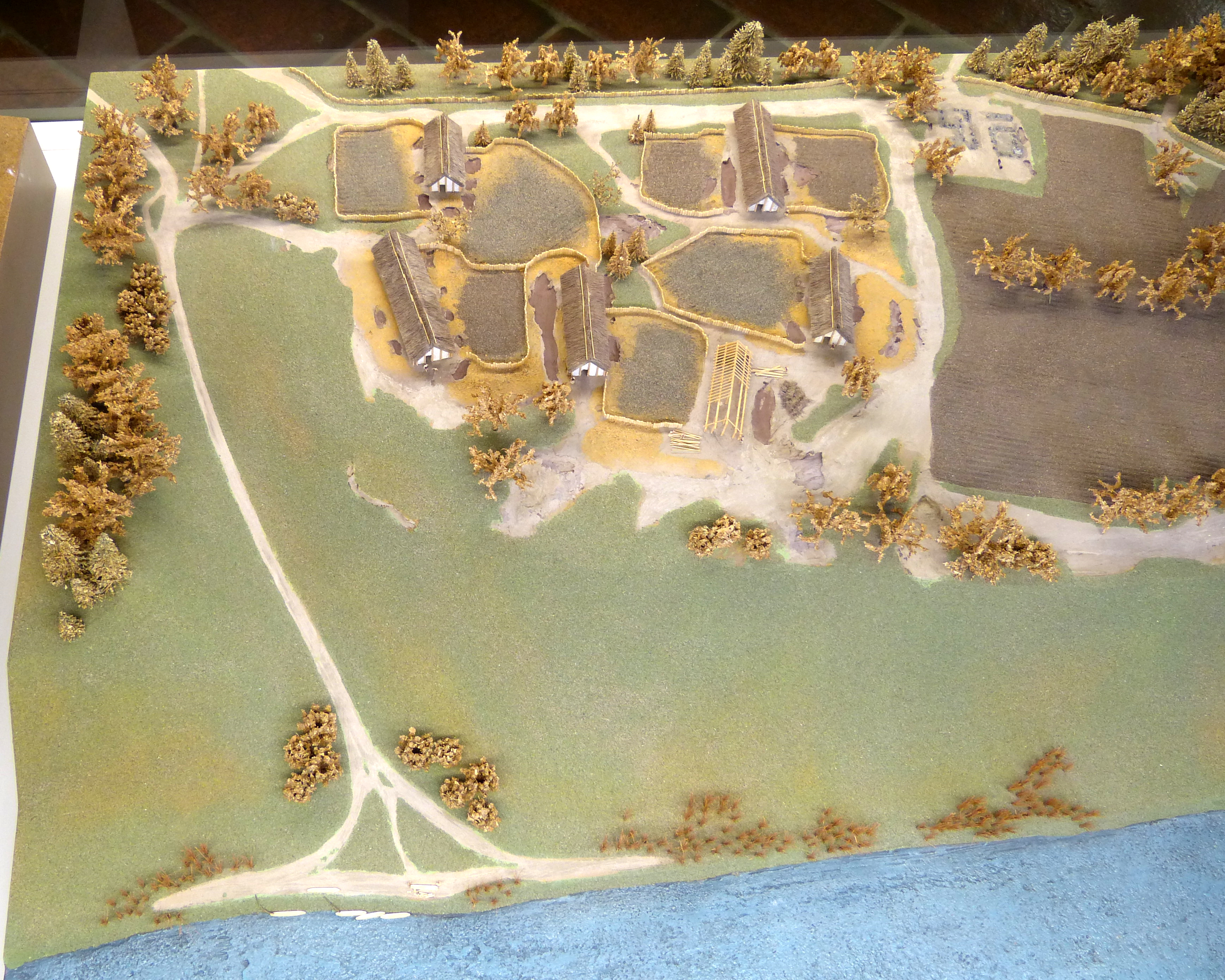
Linear pottery culture settlement at Hienheim, Germany (5th mill. BC)

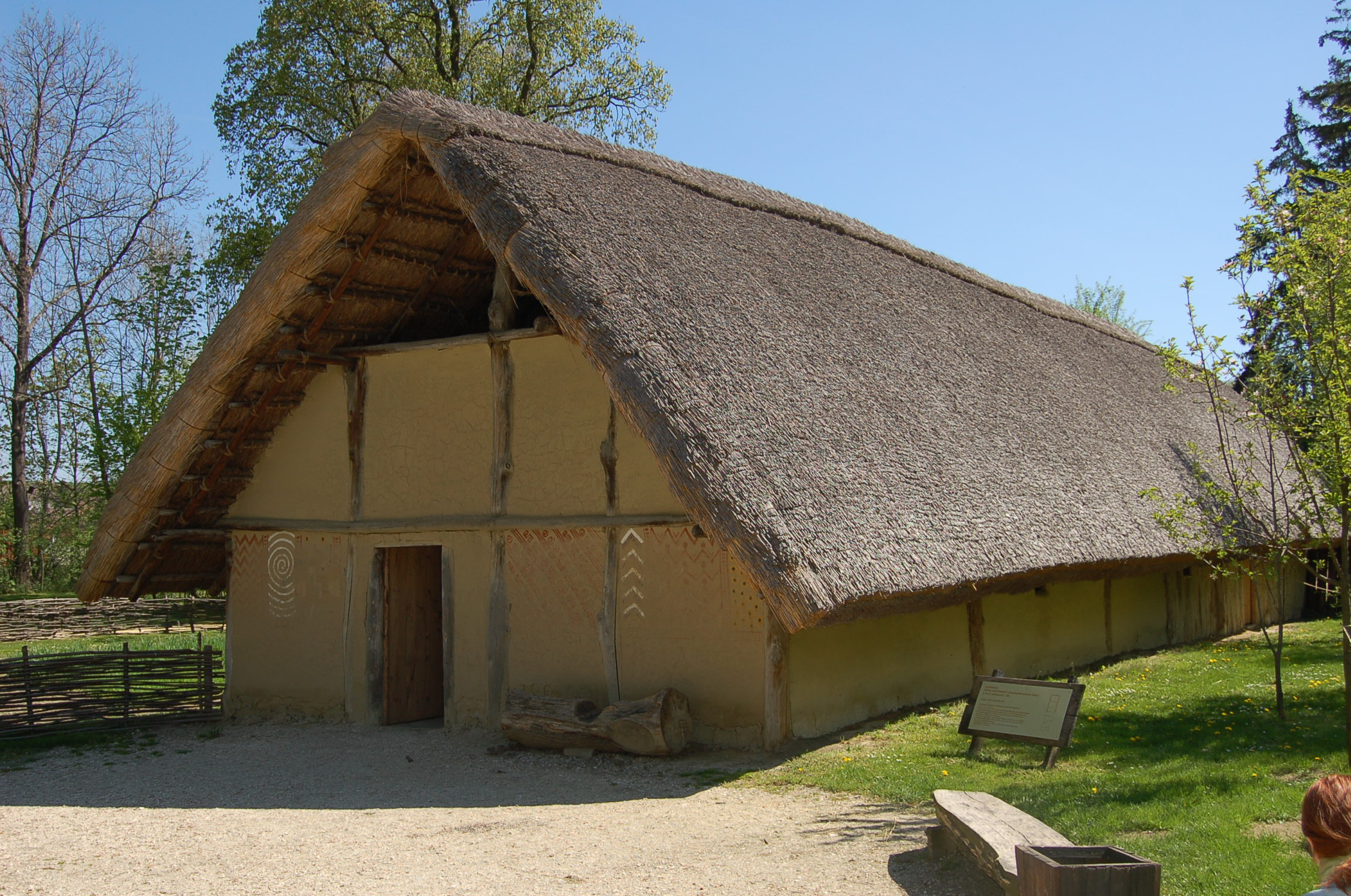
Neolithic longhouse reconstruction, Asparn an der Zaya, Austria

The LBK people settled on fluvial terraces and in the proximity of rivers in regions with fertile loess. They raised a mix of crops and associated weeds in small plots, an economy that Gimbutas called a "garden type of civilization". The difference between a crop and a weed in LBK contexts is the frequency. Crop foods are:

- Emmer
- Einkorn
- Pea
- Lentil

Species that are found so rarely as to warrant classification as possible weeds are:

- Barley
- Proso millet
- Rye
- Vicia ervilia, bitter vetch
- Vicia faba, broad or field bean

Emmer and the einkorn were sometimes grown as maslin, or mixed crops. The lower-yield einkorn predominates over emmer, which has been attributed to its better resistance to heavy rain. Hemp and flax gave the LBK people the raw material for rope and cloth, which they no doubt manufactured at home as a cottage industry. From opium poppies (Papaver somniferum), introduced later from the Mediterranean, they may have manufactured palliative medicine.

The LBK people were stock-raisers as well, with cattle favoured, though goats and swine are also recorded. Like farmers today, they may have used the better grain for themselves and the lower grades for the animals. Dogs are present here too, but rare. Substantial wild faunal remains are found. The LBK supplemented their diets by hunting deer and wild boar in the open forests of Europe as it was then.

A 2020 study by Kiel University found that the fields in the Vráble settlement were being used as pastures to produce manure, which in turn increased crop yields. This intensive subsistence system may have contributed to higher productivity in Vráble and could have been a factor in the settlement's high population density and concentration.

A 2022 study by the University of Bristol found dairy fat residues in pottery dating as early as 7,400 years ago. Researchers analyzed residues from over 4,300 vessels recovered from 70 LBK archaeological sites. Milk use was detected in about 65% of these Neolithic sites.

== Demographic history ==
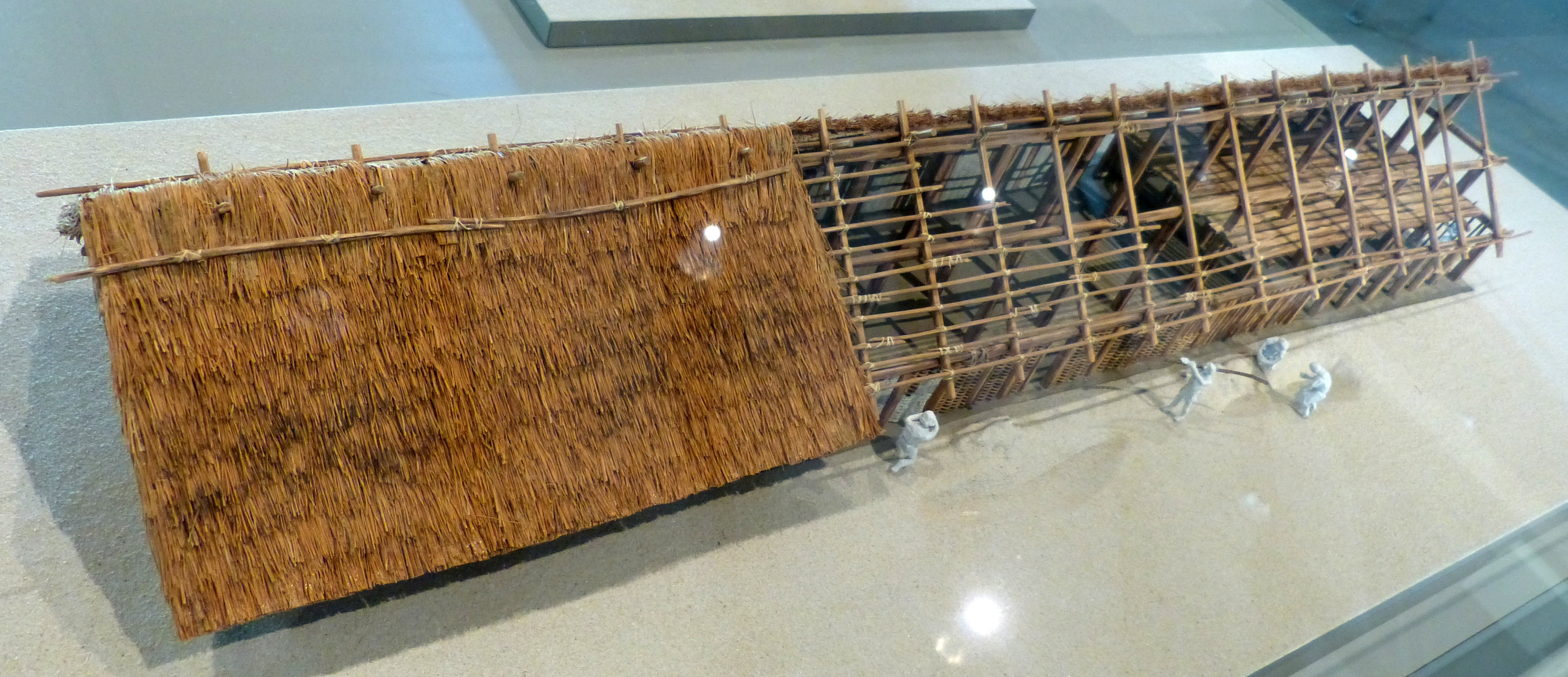
Neolithic longhouse

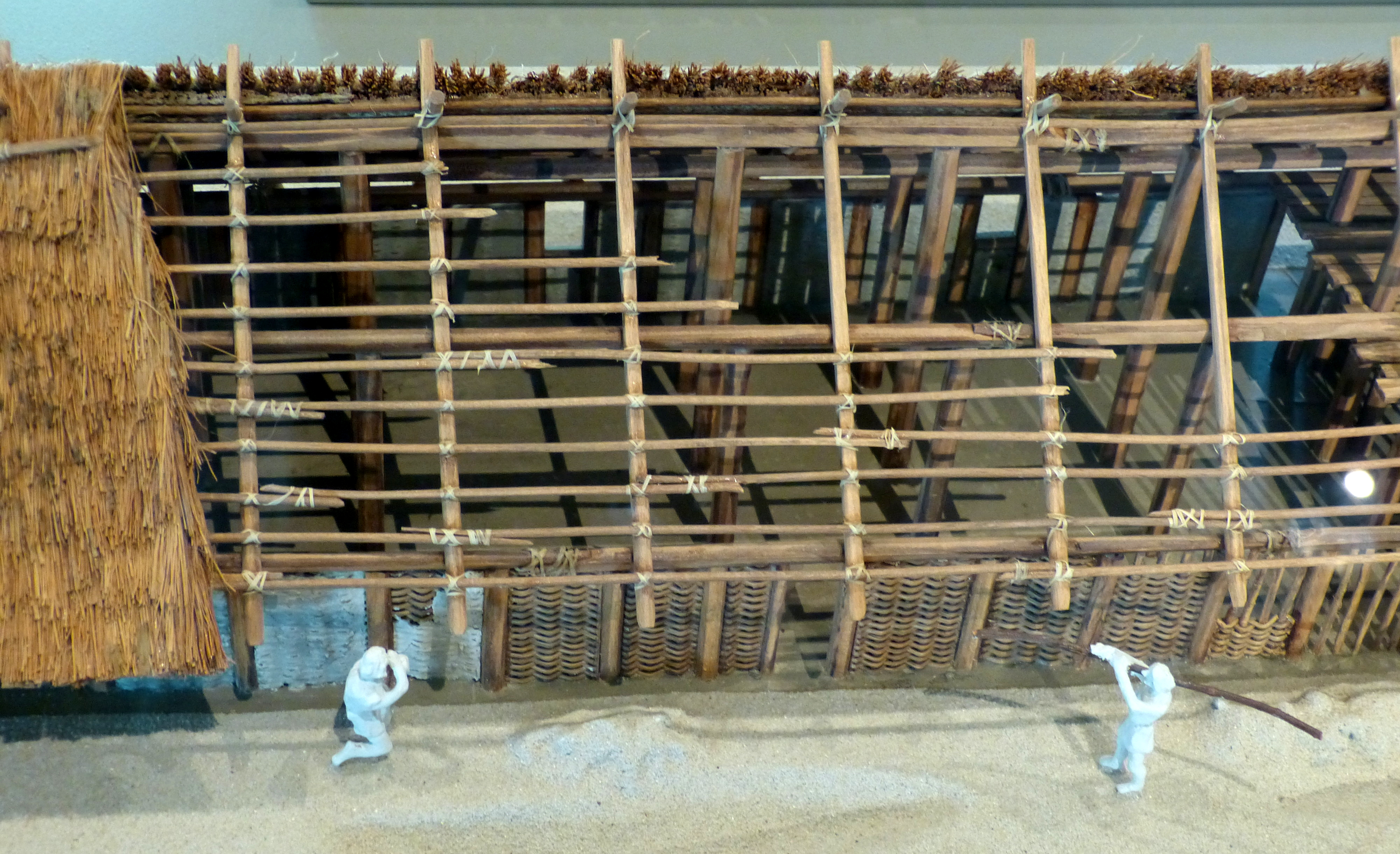
Neolithic longhouse, detail

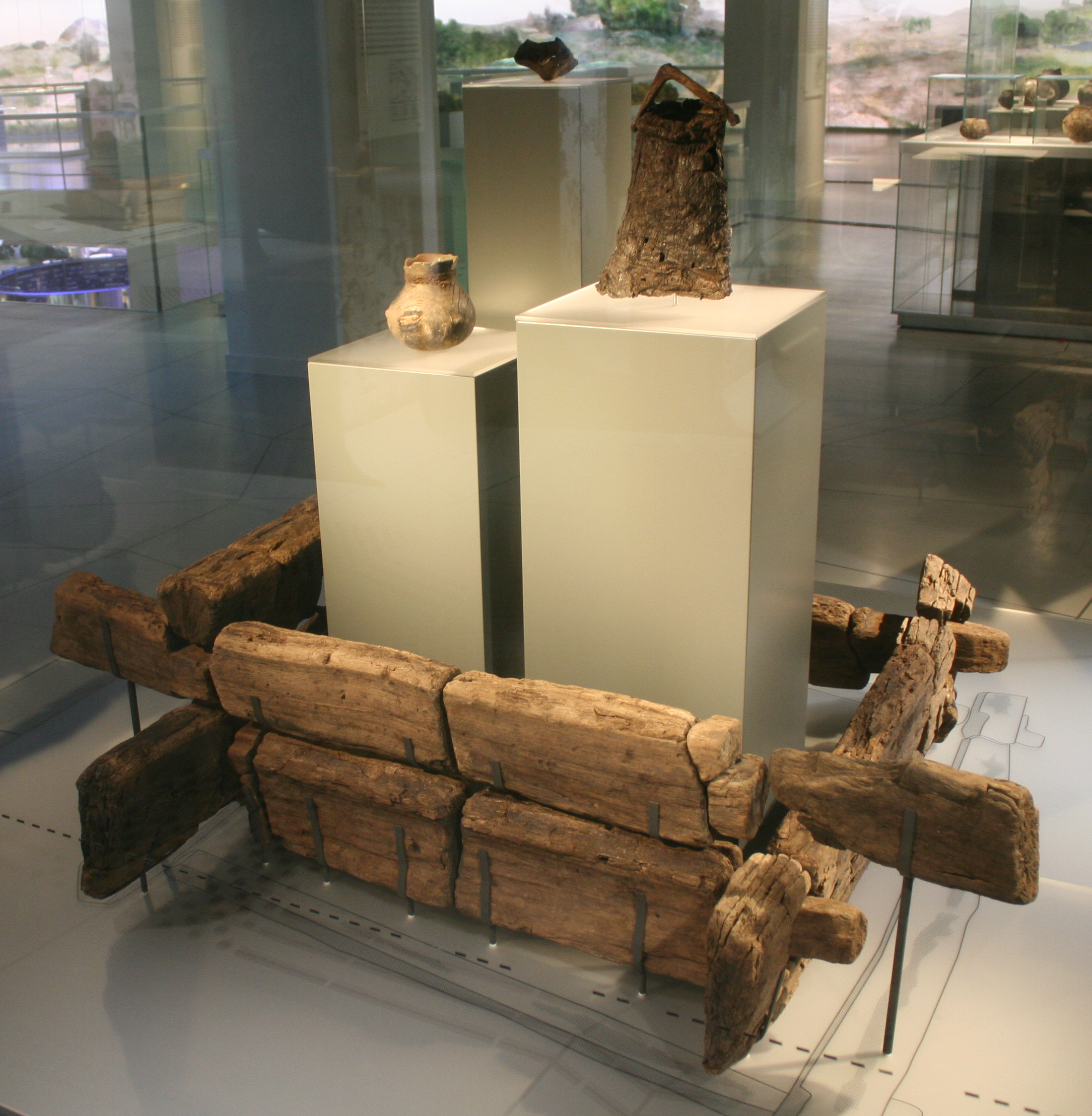
Remains of a well

Although no significant population transfers were associated with the start of the LBK, population diffusion along the wetlands of the mature civilisation (about 5200 BC) had levelled the high percentage of the rare gene sequence mentioned above by the late LBK. The population was much greater by then, a phenomenon termed the Neolithic demographic transition (NDT). According to Bocquet-Appel beginning from a stable population of "small connected groups exchanging migrants" among the "hunter-gatherers and horticulturalists" the LBK experienced an increase in birth rate caused by a "reduction in the length of the birth interval". The author hypothesizes a decrease in the weaning period made possible by division of labor. At the end of the LBK, the NDT was over and the population growth disappeared due to an increase in the mortality rate, caused, the author speculates, by new pathogens passed along by increased social contact.

The new population was sedentary up to the capacity of the land, and then the excess population moved to less-inhabited land. An in-depth GIS study by Ebersbach and Schade of an 18 km^{2} (6.9 sq mi) region in the wetlands region of Wetterau, Hesse, traces the land use in detail and discovers the limiting factor. In the study region, 82% of the land is suitable for agriculture, 11% for grazing (even though wetland), and 7% steep slopes. The investigators found that the LBK occupied this land for about 400 years. They began with 14 settlements, 53 houses, and 318 people, using the wetlands for cattle pasture. Settlement gradually spread over the wetlands, reaching a maximum of 47 settlements, 122 houses, and 732 people in the late period.

Toward the end, the population suddenly dropped to initial levels, though much of the arable land was still available. The investigators concluded cattle were the main economic interest and available grazing land was the limiting factor in settlement. The Neolithic of the Middle East featured urban concentrations of people subsisting mainly on grain. Beef and dairy products, however, were the mainstay of LBK diet. When the grazing lands were all in use, they moved elsewhere in search of them. As the relatively brief window of the LBK falls roughly in the centre of the Atlantic period, a maximum of temperature and rainfall, a conclusion that the spread of wetlands at that time encouraged the growth and spreading of the LBK is to some degree justified.

With some exceptions, population levels rose rapidly at the beginning of the Neolithic. This was followed by a population decline of "enormous magnitude" after 5000 BC, with levels remaining low during the next 1,500 years.

Investigation of the Neolithic skeletons found in the Talheim Death Pit (c. 5000 BC) suggests that prehistoric men from neighboring tribes were prepared to fight and kill each other in order to capture and secure women. The mass grave at Talheim in southern Germany is one of the earliest known sites in the archaeological record that shows evidence of organised violence in early Neolithic Europe among various LBK tribes.

Other speculations as to the reasons for violence between settlements include vengeance, conflicts over land and resources, and slave raiding. Some of these theories related to the lack of resources are supported by the discovery that various LBK fortifications bordering indigenously-inhabited areas appear to have not been in use for very long. The massacre of Schletz occurred at the same time as the massacre at Talheim and several other known massacres, and its mass grave was fortified, which serves as evidence of violent conflict among tribes and means that these fortifications were built as a form of defense against aggressors. Findings from Herxheim and Vráble also show that significant changes in ritual practises emerged at the end of the LBK, which however were not associated to violence necessarily.

== Material culture ==
=== Tool kit ===
The tool kit was appropriate to the economy. Flint and obsidian were the main materials used for points and cutting edges. There is no sign of metal. For example, they harvested with sickles manufactured by inserting flint blades into the inside of curved pieces of wood. One tool, the "shoe-last celt", was made of a ground stone chisel blade tied to a handle, with shape and wear showing that they were used as adzes to fell trees and to work wood. Augers were made of flint points tied to sticks that could be rotated. Scrapers and knives are found in abundance. The use of flint pieces, or microliths, descended from the Mesolithic, while the ground stone is characteristic of the Neolithic.

These materials are evidence both of specialization of labor and commerce. The flint used came from southern Poland; the obsidian came from the Bükk and Tatra mountains. Settlements in those regions specialized in mining and manufacture. The products were exported to all the other LBK regions, which must have had something to trade. This commerce is a strong argument for an ethnic unity between the scattered pockets of the culture.

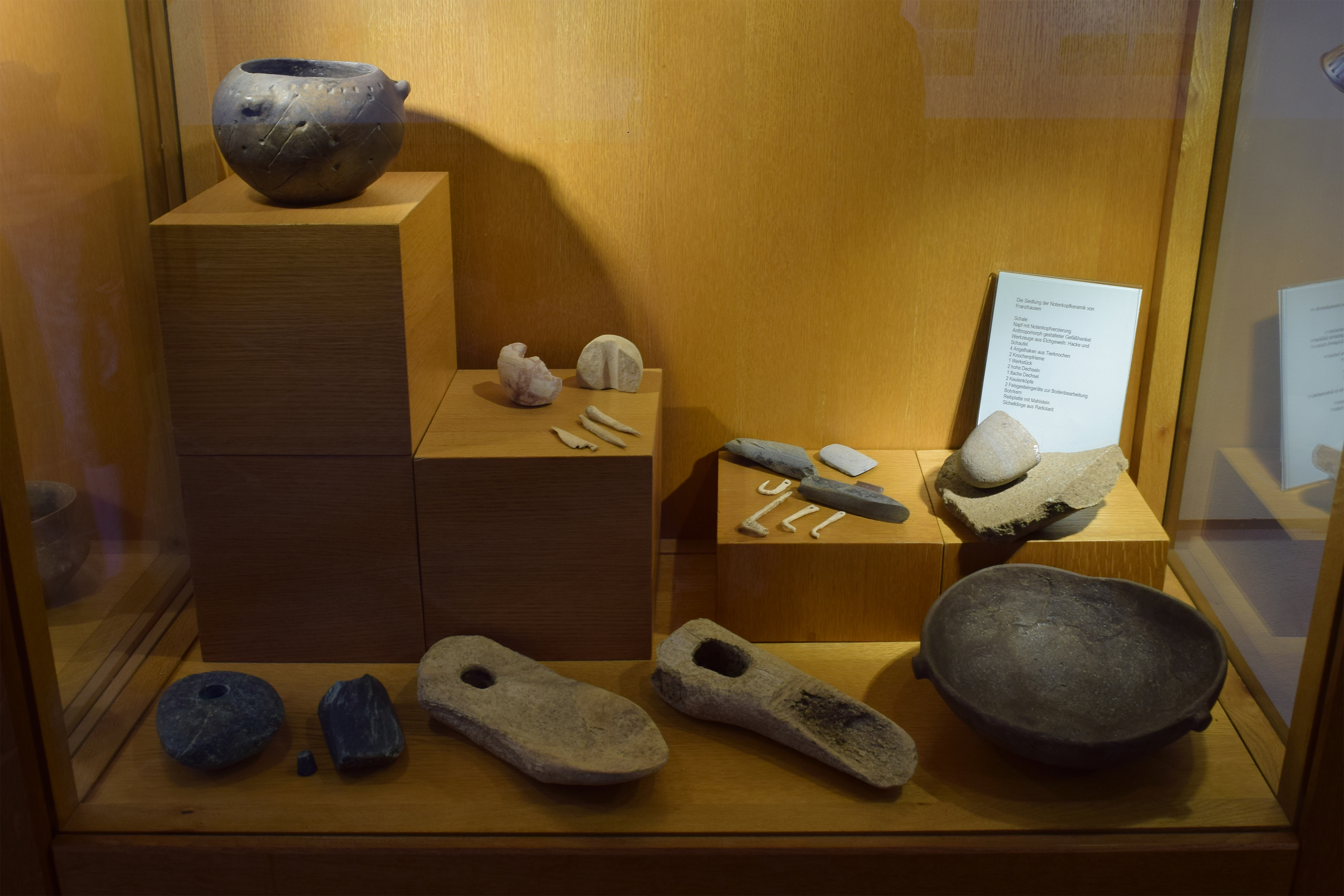
Various artefacts

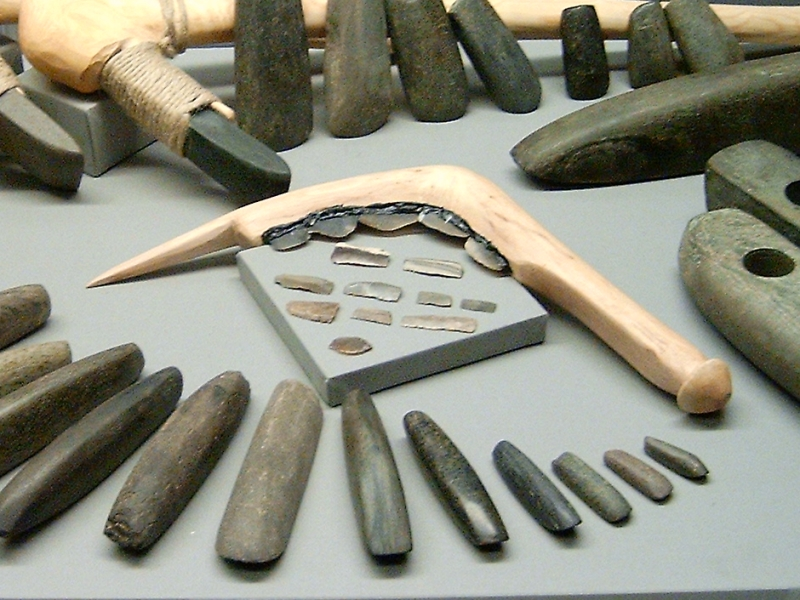
Stone axes and sickle

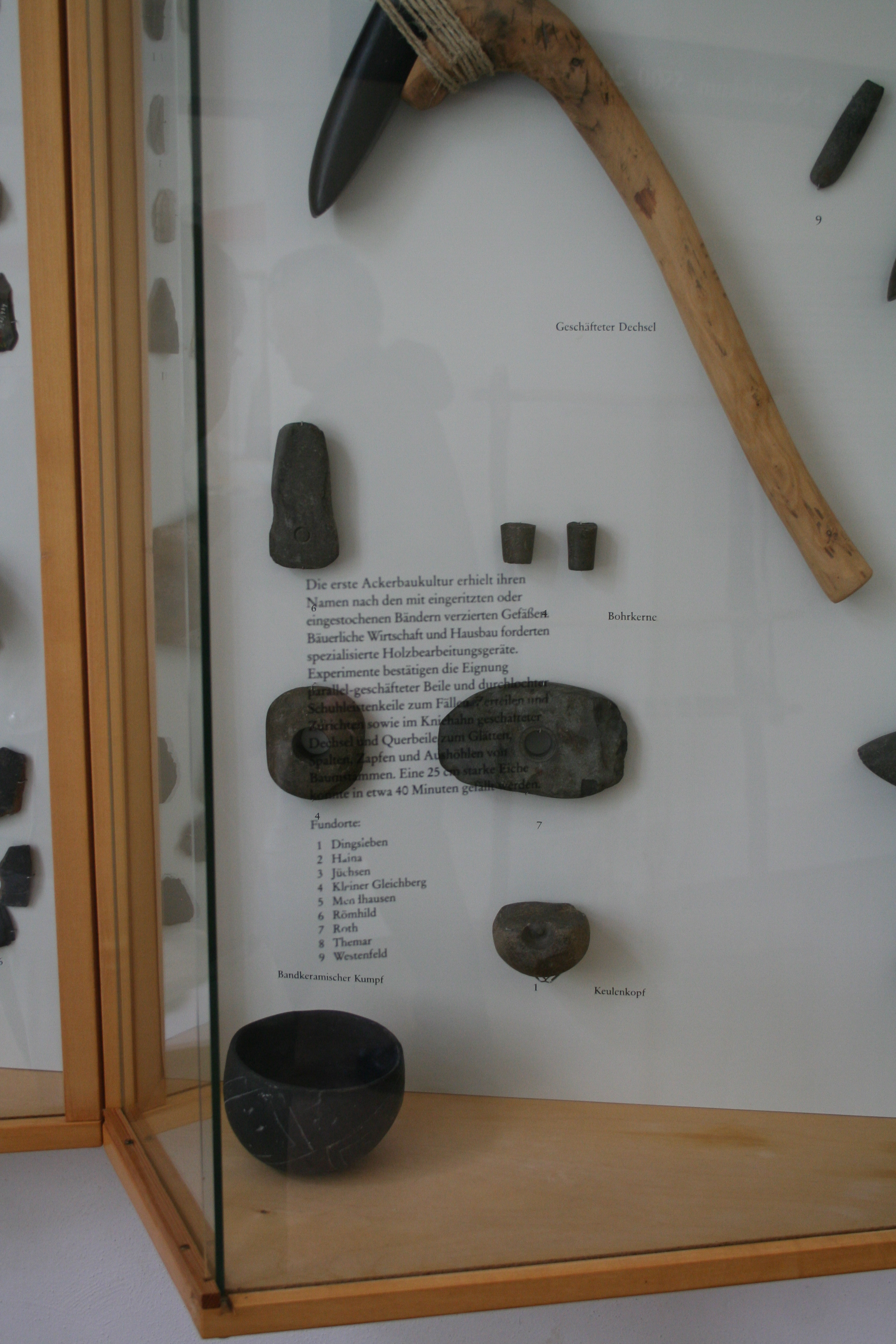
Stone axe

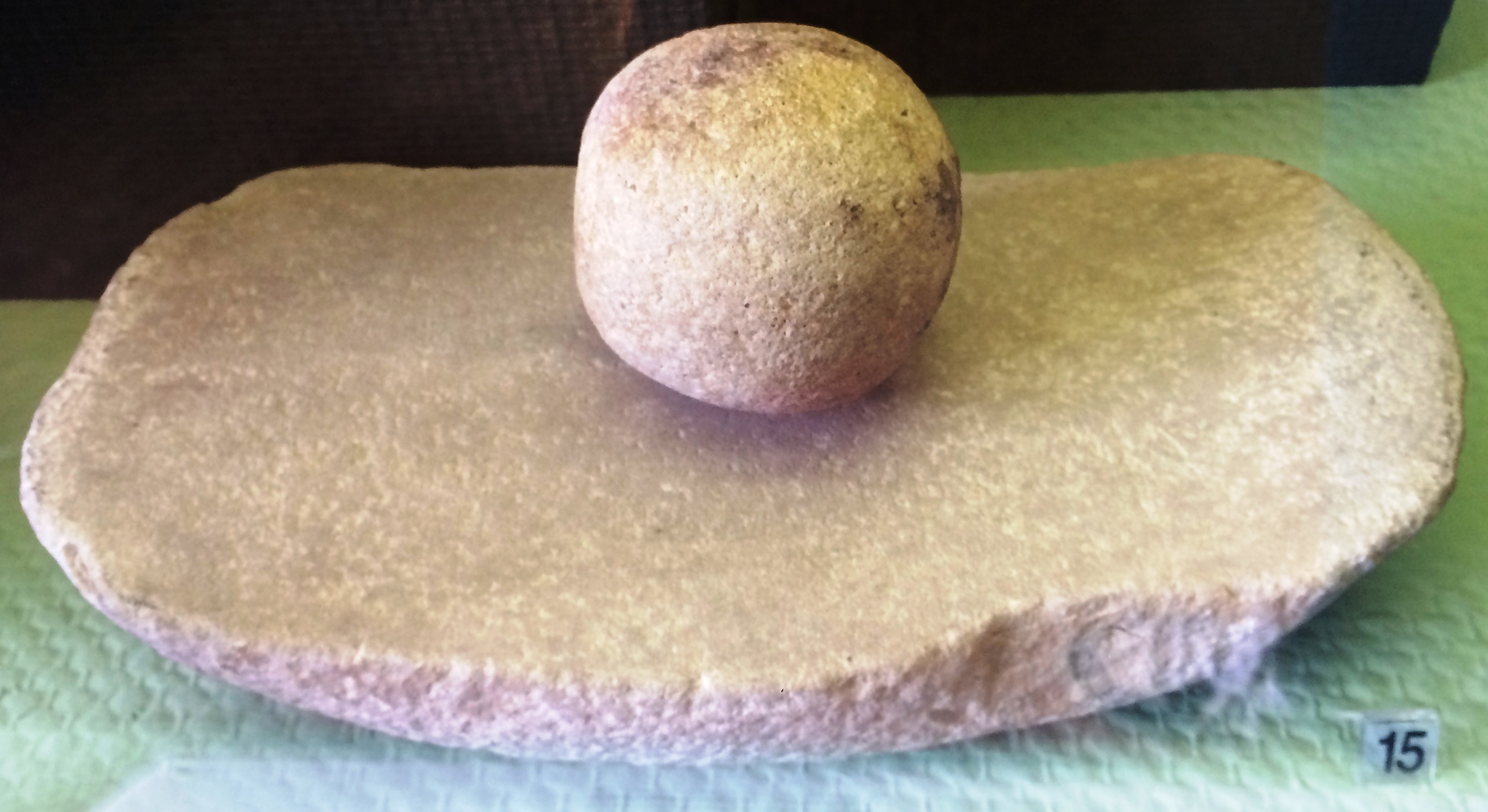
Grinding stone

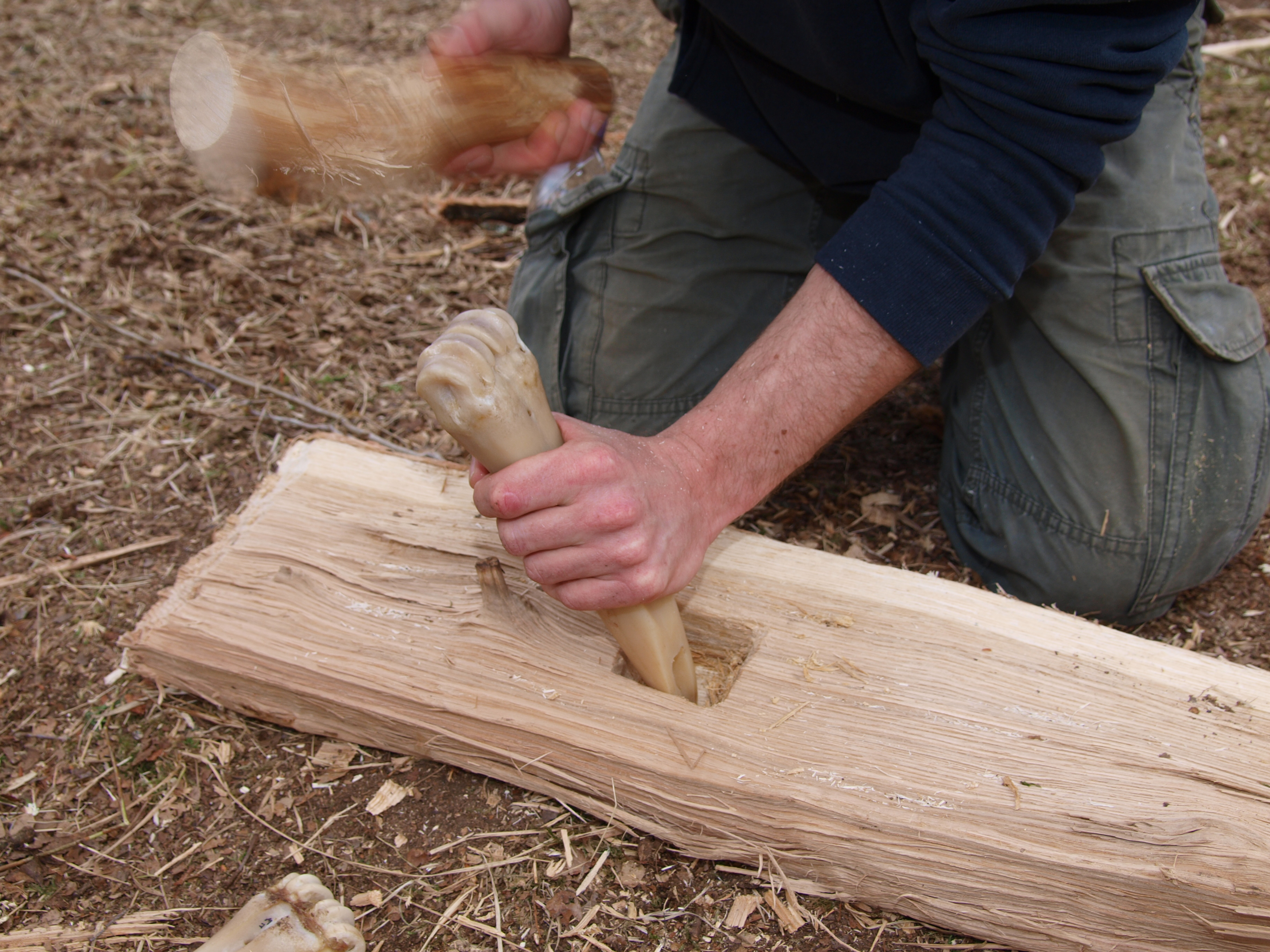
Bone chisel reconstruction

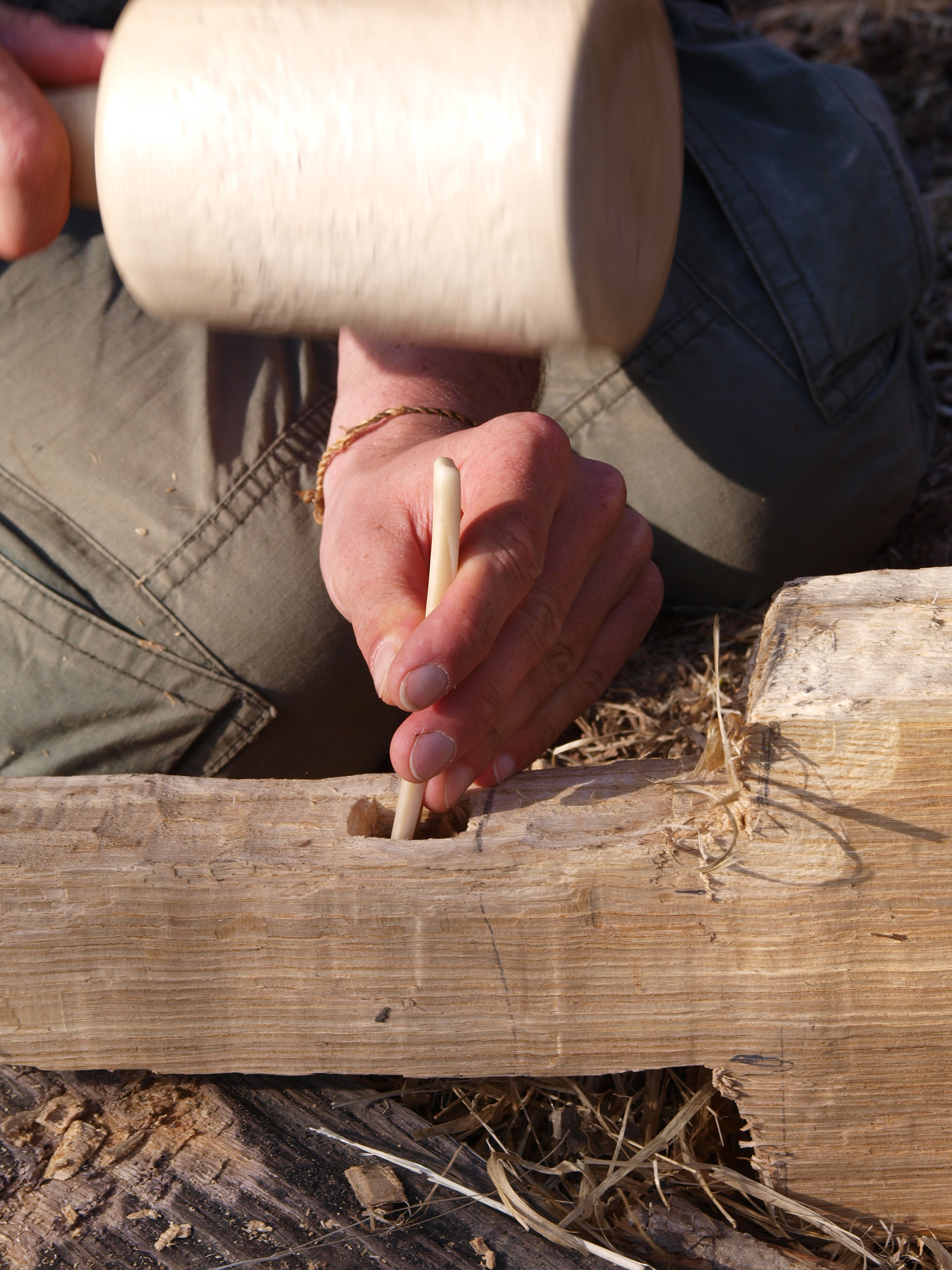
Small bone Chisel reconstruction

=== Settlement patterns ===
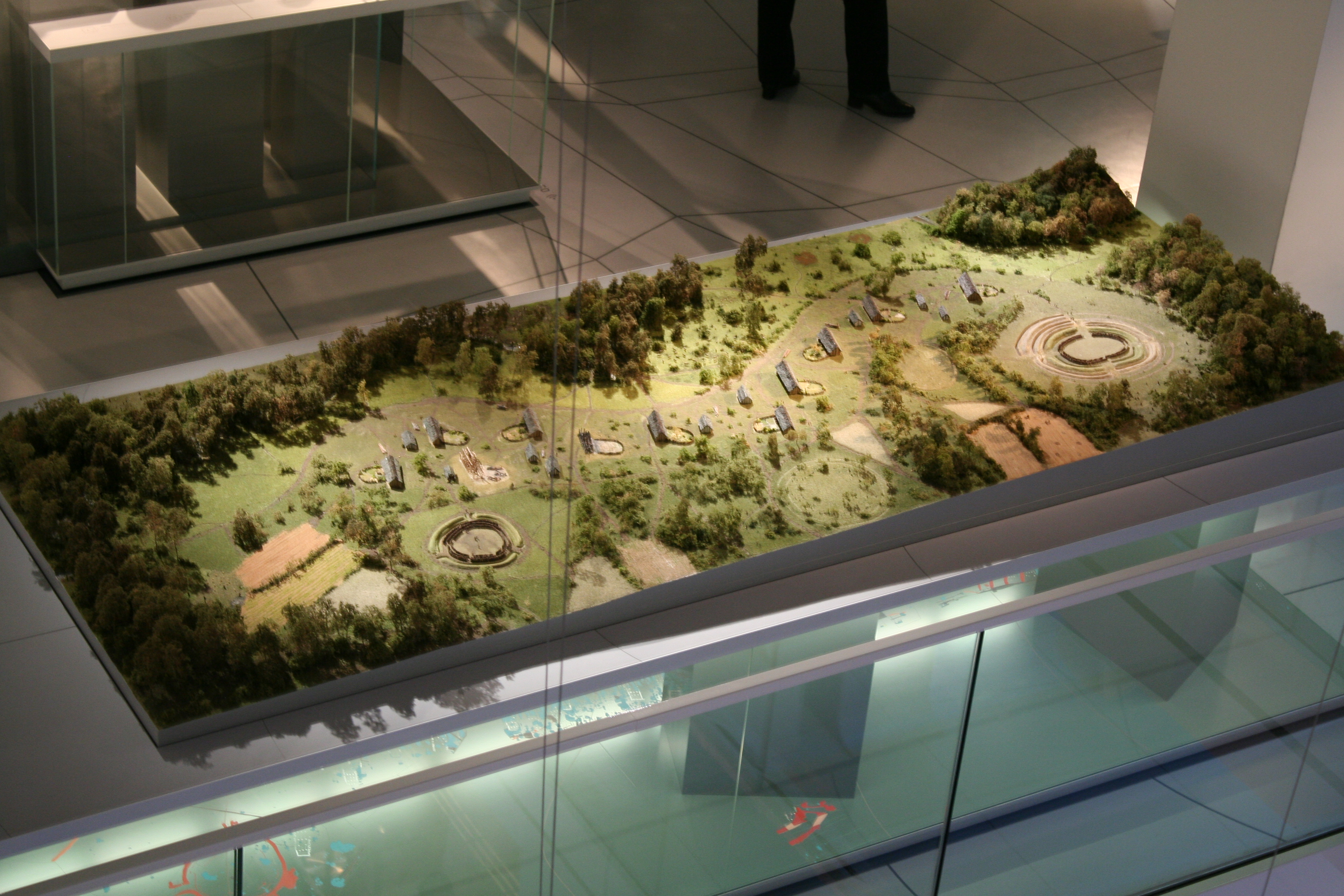
Dresden-Nickern, Germany, Stroke-ornamented culture settlement model

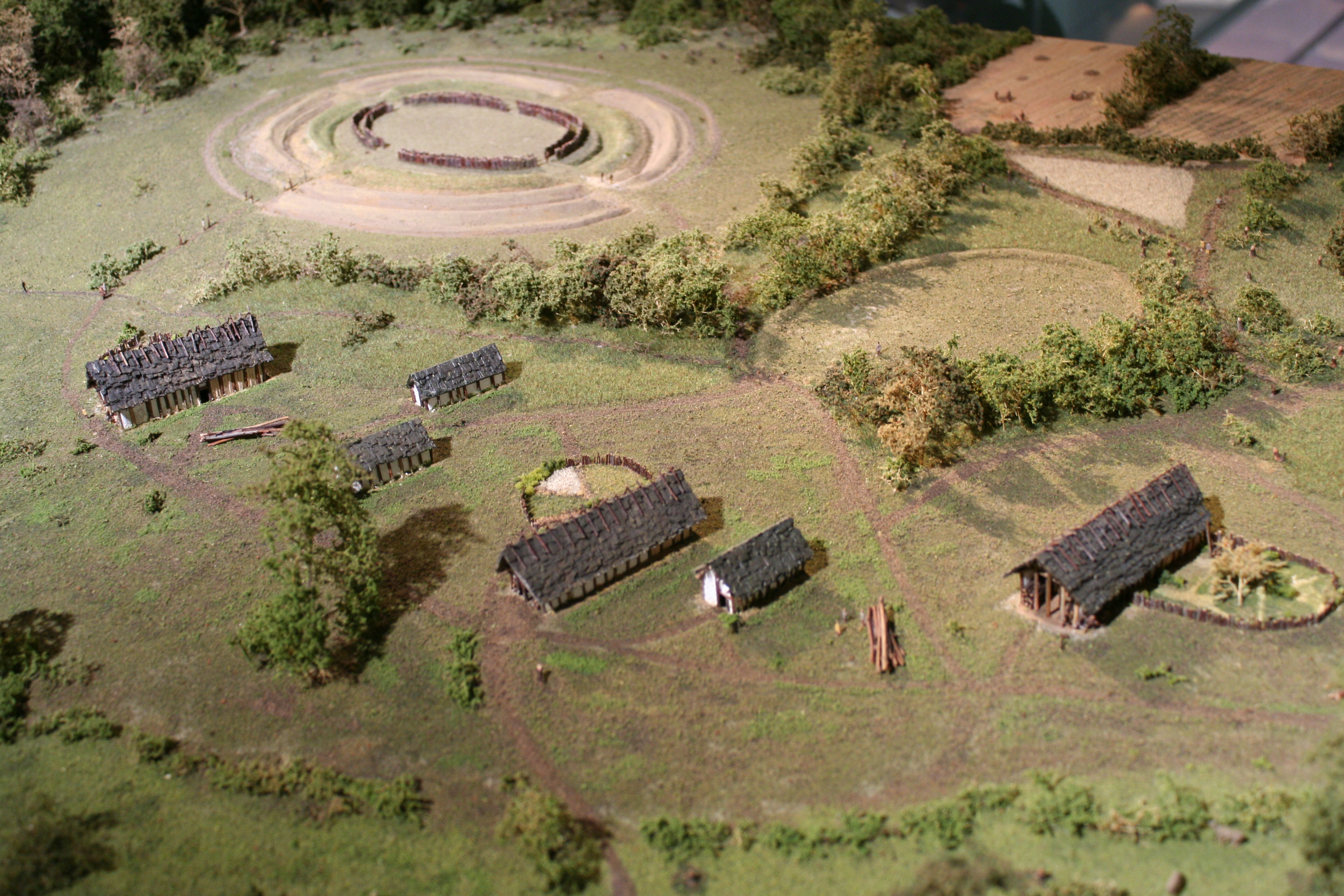
Dresden-Nickern, Germany, settlement model, detail

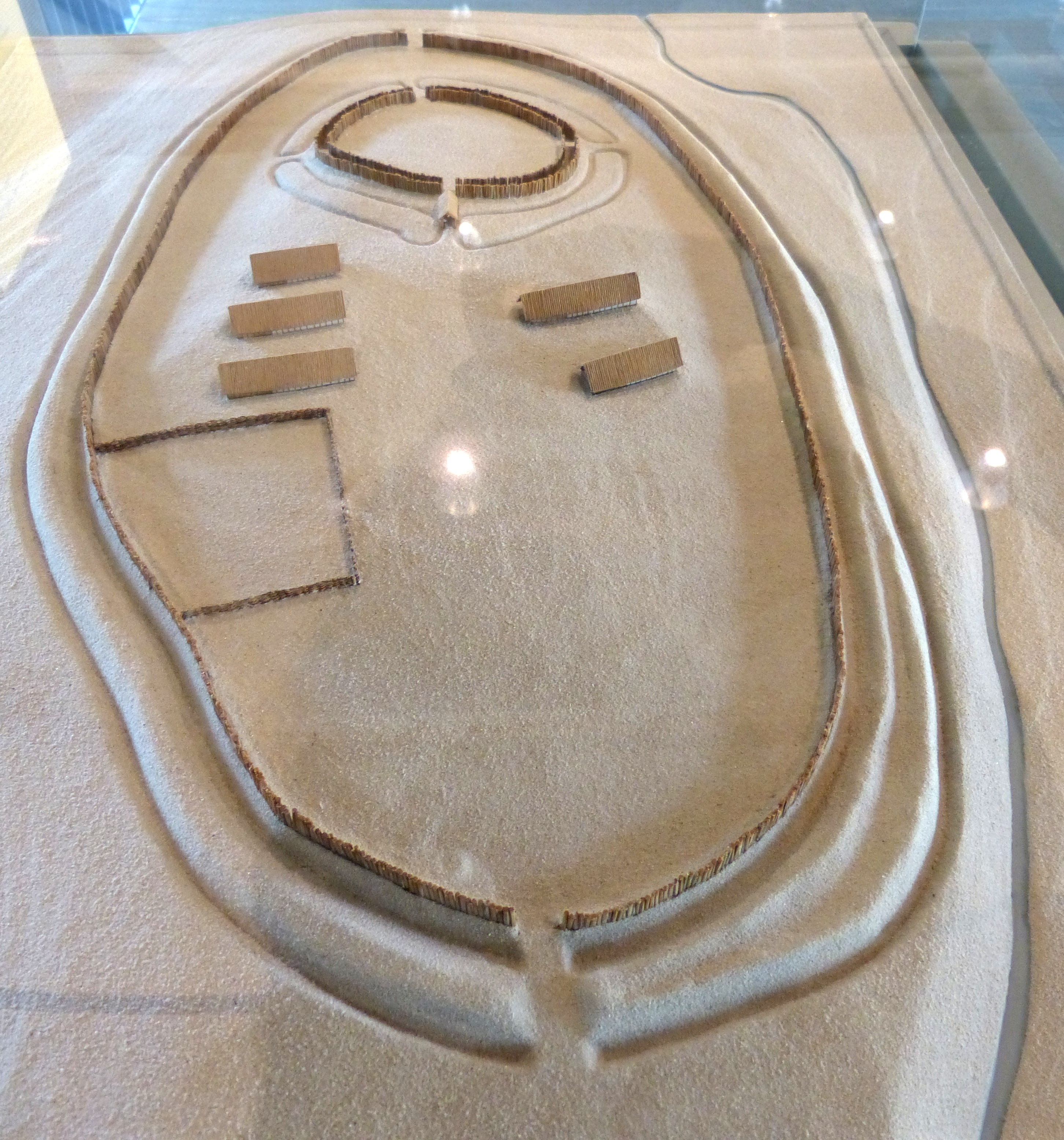
Fortified settlement at Künzing-Unternberg, Germany

The unit of residence was the long house, a rectangular structure, 5.5 to 7.0 m (18.0 to 23.0 ft) wide, of variable length; for example, a house at Bylany was 45 m (148 ft). Outer walls were wattle-and-daub, sometimes alternating with split logs, with slanted, thatched roofs, supported by rows of poles, three across. The exterior wall of the home was solid and massive, oak posts being preferred. Clay for the daub was dug from pits near the house, which were then used for storage. Extra posts at one end may indicate a partial second story. Some LBK houses were occupied for as long as 30 years. Linear Pottery longhouses were the largest free-standing buildings in the world at the time.

It is thought that these houses had no windows and only one doorway. The door was located at one end of the house. Internally, the house had one or two partitions creating up to three areas. Interpretations of the use of these areas vary. Working activities might be carried out in the better lit door end, the middle used for sleeping and eating and the end farthest from the door could have been used for grain storage. According to another view, the interior was divided in areas for sleeping, common life and a fenced enclosure at the back end for keeping animals.

Ditches went along part of the outer walls, especially at the enclosed end. Their purpose is not known, but they probably are not defensive works, as they were not much of a defense. More likely, the ditches collected waste water and rain water.

Trash was regularly removed and placed in external pits. The waste-producing work, such as hide preparation and flint-working, was done outside the house.

Pottery has been found in long houses, as well as in graves. Analysis of the home pottery reveals that each house had its own tradition. The occurrence of pottery primarily in female graves indicates the women of the long house probably made the pottery; in fact, lineages have been defined. Gimbutas goes so far as to assert, "The indirect results indicate an endogamous, matrilocal residence."

Easy access to fresh water also would have been mandatory, which is another reason why settlements were in bottom lands near water. A number of timber-built wells from the times have been discovered, with a log-cabin type lining constructed one layer at a time as the previous layers sank into the well. Analysis of preserved wells has shown that the LBK culture possessed sophisticated carpentry skills and were capable of complex timber constructions.

The LBK culture also built timber trackways, the remains of some of which have been preserved, for example at the Campemoor bog in Lower Saxony (Germany), dated to c. 4630 – c. 4550 BC (trackway Pr31).

Long houses were gathered into villages of five to eight houses, spaced about 20 m (66 ft) apart, occupying 300–1,250 acres (120–510 ha). Nearby villages formed settlement cells, some as dense as 20 per 25 km^{2} (9.7 sq mi), others as sparse as one per 32 km^{2} (12 sq mi). This structuring of settlements does not support a view that the LBK population had no social structure, or was anarchic. However, the structure remains obscure and interpretational. One long house may have supported one extended family, but the short lifespan would have precluded more than two generations. The houses required too much labor to be the residences of single families; consequently, communal houses are postulated. Though the known facts are tantalizing, the correct social interpretation of the layout of a long house and the arrangement of villages will have to wait for clearer evidence. At least some villages were fortified for some time with a palisade and outer ditch.

The LBK settlement at Vráble in Slovakia had an estimated 70 contemporaneous longhouses and a population of up to 1725 people at its peak in c. 5100 BC, making it one of the largest LBK settlements of the period. The longhouses were grouped into three 'neighbourhoods', one of which was surrounded by trenches and a palisade. The remains of at least 313 longhouses have been found at the Vráble site. The remains of 300 longhouses have also been found at the settlement of Eythra in Germany, indicating a similar sized-population within the same time-frame as that at Vráble.

Excavations at Osłonki in Poland revealed a large, fortified settlement (dating to 4300 BC, i.e., Late LBK), covering an area of 4000m2. Nearly 30 trapezoidal longhouses and over 80 graves were discovered. The rectangular longhouses were between 7 and 45 m (23 and 148 ft) long and between 5 and 7 m (16 and 23 ft) wide. They were built of massive timber posts chinked with wattle and daub mortar.

An earlier view saw the Linear Pottery culture as living a "peaceful, unfortified lifestyle". Since then, as well as settlements with palisades, weapon-traumatized skeletons have also been discovered, such as at Herxheim in Germany. Whether it was the site of a massacre or of a martial ritual, the Herxheim remains demonstrate "systematic violence between groups". In 2015 a study published in Proceedings of the National Academy of Sciences detailed findings at a site near Schöneck-Kilianstädten, including the skeletons of 26 adults and children who were killed by "devastating strikes to the head or arrow wounds." The skull fractures are classic signs of blunt force injuries caused by basic Stone Age weapons. Many headless remains have been found around Vráble.

== Religion ==
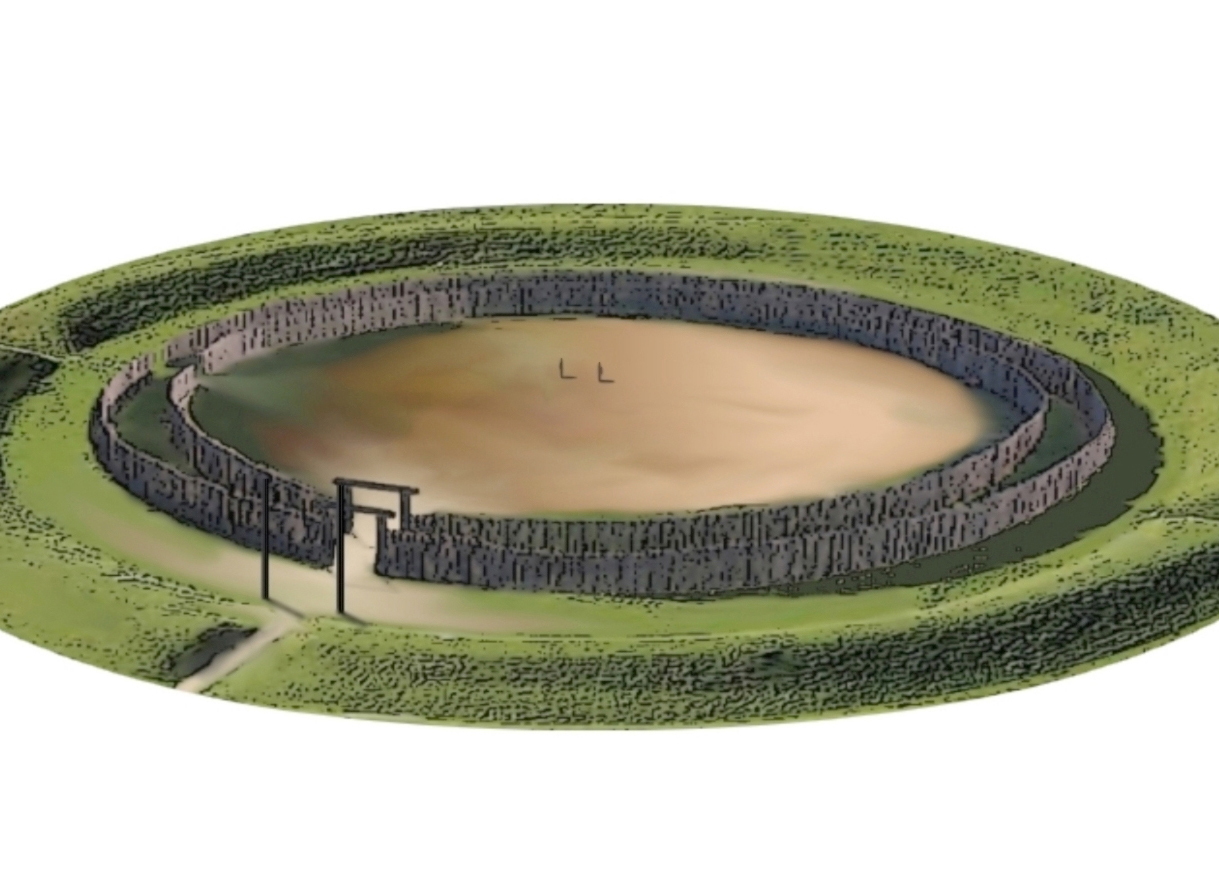
Goseck circle, c. 4900 BC

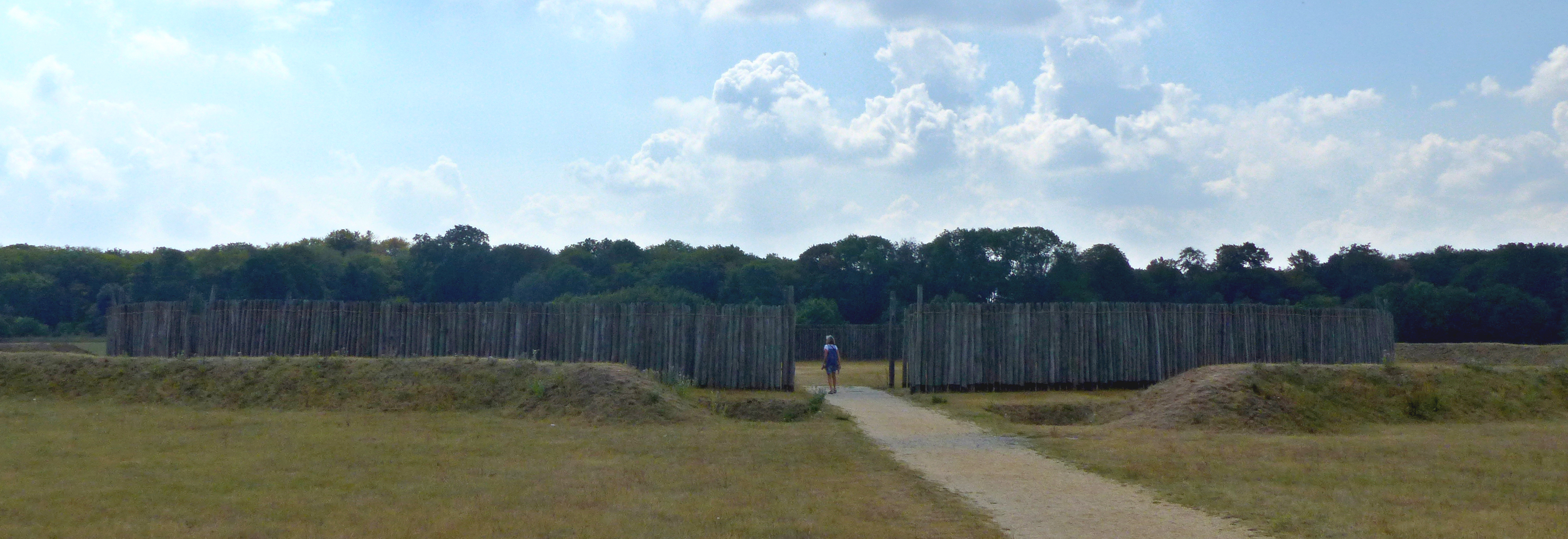
Goseck circle reconstruction

As is true of all prehistoric cultures, the details of actual belief systems maintained by the Linear Pottery culture population are poorly understood relative to beliefs and religions of historical periods. The extent to which prehistoric beliefs formed a systematic religious canon is also the subject of some debate. Nevertheless, comparative, detailed, scientific study of cultural artifacts and iconography has led to the proposal of models.

The mother goddess model is the major one applied to the Neolithic of the Middle and Near East, the civilization of the Aegean and Europe. The iconography was inherited from the Palaeolithic. The Gravettian culture introduced it into the range of the future LBK from western Asia and south Russia. From there, it diffused throughout Europe in the Upper Palaeolithic, which was inhabited by Cro-Magnon man and was responsible for many works of art, such as the Venus of Willendorf.

With the transition to the Neolithic, "the female principle continued to predominate the cultures that had grown up around the mysterious processes of birth and generation." The LBK, therefore, did not bring anything new spiritually to Europe, nor was the cult in any way localized to Europe. It is reflected in the vase paintings, figurines, graves and grave goods, and surviving customs and myths of Europe. In the north, the goddess could manifest herself as the mistress of animals, grain, distaff and loom, household, and life and death.

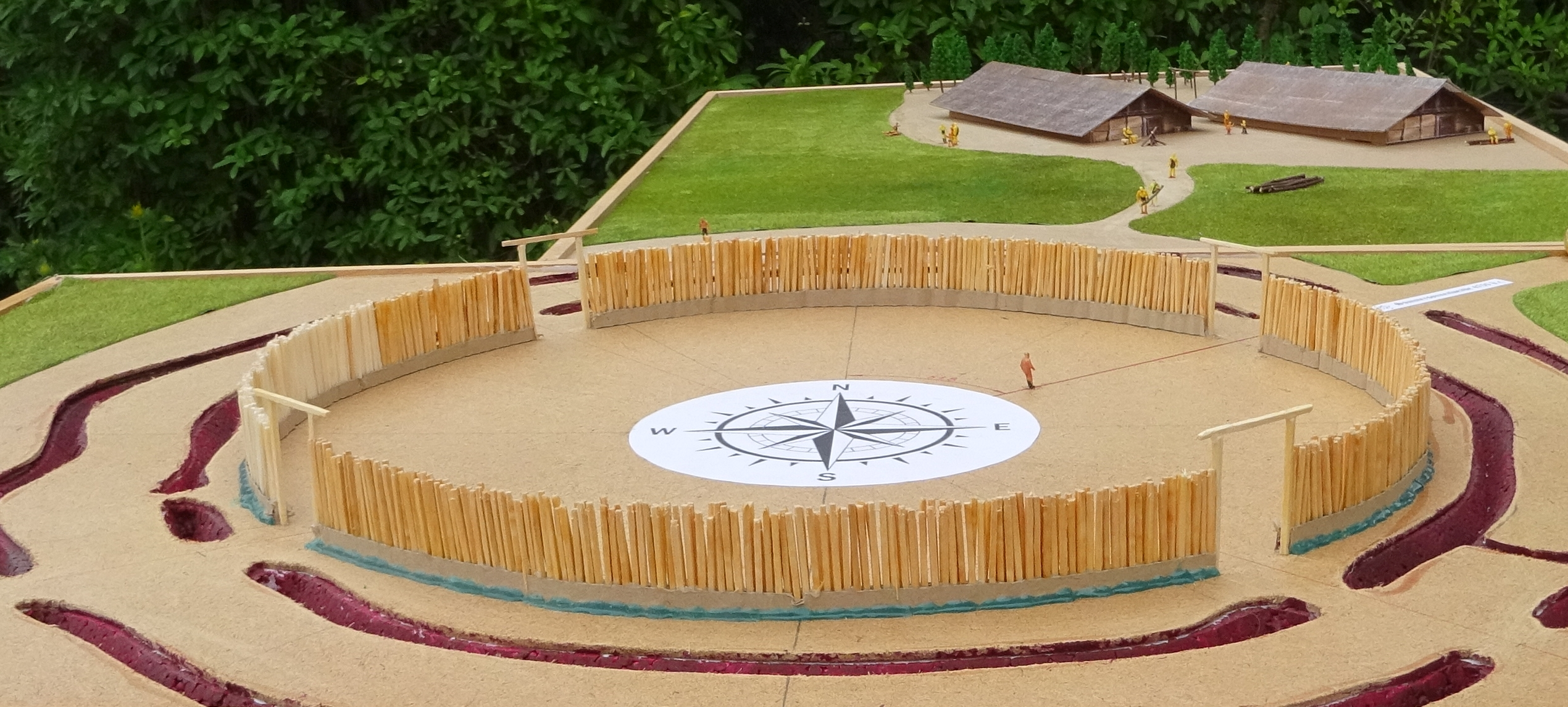
Model of the Bochow Circle and longhouses, Germany, c. 4700 BC

The works of the noted late archaeologist Marija Gimbutas present a major study of the iconography and surviving beliefs of the European Neolithic, including the Linear Pottery culture. She was able to trace the unity of reproductive themes in cultural objects previously unsuspected of such themes. For example, the burial pits of the Linear Pottery culture, which were lined with stone, clay, or plaster, may have been intended to represent eggs. The deceased returns to the egg, so to speak, there to await rebirth.

The presence of such pits contemporaneously with the burial of women and children under the floors of houses suggests an assortment of religious convictions, as does the use of both cremation and inhumation. Some of the figurines are not of females but are androgynous.

== Funerary customs ==
The early Neolithic in Europe featured burials of women and children under the floors of personal residences. Remains of adult males are missing. Probably, Neolithic culture featured sex discrimination in funerary customs, and women and children were important in ideology concerning the home.

Burials beneath the floors of homes continued until about 4000 BC. However, in the Balkans and central Europe, the cemetery also came into use at about 5000 BC. LBK cemeteries contained from 20 to 200 graves arranged in groups that appear to have been based on kinship. Males and females of any age were included. Both cremation and inhumation were practiced. The inhumed were placed in a flexed position in pits lined with stones, plaster, or clay. Cemeteries were close to, but distinct from, residential areas.

The presence of grave goods indicates both a sex and a dominance discrimination. Male graves included stone celts, flint implements, and Spondylus shells from the Aegean. Female graves contained many of the same artifacts as male graves, but also most of the pottery and containers of ochre. The goods have been interpreted as gifts to the departed or personal possessions.

Only about 30% of the graves have goods. This circumstance has been interpreted as some sort of distinction in dominance, but the exact nature is not known. If the goods were gifts, then some were more honored than others; if they were possessions, then some were wealthier than others.

These practices are contrasted to mass graves, such as the Talheim Death Pit, the Herxheim archaeological site and the settlement of Vráble. Herxheim was a ritual center and a mass grave that contained the scattered remains of at least 450 individuals.

== See also ==
- Cardium pottery
- Pannonian Basin
- Demic diffusion
- Ertebølle culture
- Great Hungarian Plain
- Goseck Circle
- Haplogroup N1a (mtDNA)
- Hunter-gatherer
- Little Hungarian Plain
- Mesolithic
- History of Central European forests#The most recent post-glacial period - return migration of tree species
- Neolithic Europe, founder crops, Neolithic long house, Neolithic Revolution
- Old Europe (archaeology)
- History of Hungary before the Hungarian conquest

== Bibliography ==
- Braidwood, Robert, Prehistoric men, William Morrow and Company, many editions
- Childe, Vere Gordon (1951). Man Makes Himself. New York: the New American Library (a Mentor Book).
- Christensen, Jonas (2004). "Warfare in the European Neolithic". Acta Archaeologica. 75 (142, 144, 136): 129. doi:10.1111/j.0065-001X.2004.00014.x.
- Clark, Grahame; Piggott, Stuart (1967). Prehistoric Societies. New York: Alfred A. Knopf. ISBN 978-0-14-021149-8.
- Davidson, Hilda Ellis (1998). Roles of the Northern Goddess. Routledge. ISBN 978-0-415-13610-5.
- Ehrich, Robert W. (1965). Chronologies in Old World Archaeology. Chicago and London: The University of Chicago Press. ISBN 978-0-226-19445-5.
- Gimbutas, Marija (1982). The Goddesses and Gods of Old Europe 6500–3500 BC: Myths and Cult Images: New and Updated Edition. Berkeley, Los Angeles: University of California Press. p. 27. ISBN 978-0-520-04655-9.
- Gimbutas, Marija (1991). The Civilization of the Goddess: The World of Old Europe. San Francisco: HarperCollins Publishers (HarperSanFrancisco). ISBN 978-0-06-250368-8.
- Hawkes, Jacquetta (1965). Prehistory. New York: the New American Library (a Mentor Book).
- Hibben, Frank (1958). Prehistoric Man in Europe. Norman, Oklahoma: University of Oklahoma Press.
- James, E.O. (1994). The Cult of the Mother-Goddess. New York: Barnes&Noble. ISBN 978-1-56619-600-0.
- Kertész, Róbert (2002). "Mesolithic Hunter-Gatherers in the Northwestern Part of the Great Hungarian Plain" (PDF). Praehistoria. 3. Archived from the original (PDF) on 27 September 2007.
- Mallory, J.P. (1997). "Linear Band Ware Culture". Encyclopedia of Indo-European Culture. Fitzroy Dearborn.
- Marciniak, Arkadiusz (2005). Placing Animals in the Neolithic: Social Zooarchaeology of Prehistoric Farming Communities. Routledge Cavendish. ISBN 978-1-84472-092-7.
- Renfrew, Colin (1990). Archaeology and Language: The Puzzle of Indo-European Origins. Cambridge University Press. ISBN 978-0-521-38675-3.
- Stäuble, Harald (2005). Häuser und absolute Datierung der Ältesten Bandkeramik. Habelt.
