= Bylany =

Bylany is name of several locations in the Czech Republic:

- Bylany (archaeology), an excavated Neolithic settlement, Central Bohemian Region
- Bylany (Chrudim District), a village in the Pardubice Region
