= Danubian culture =

Neolithic archaeological culture in Eastern Europe

The term Danubian culture was coined by the Australian archaeologist Vere Gordon Childe to describe the first agrarian society in Central Europe and Eastern Europe. It covers the Linear Pottery culture (Linearbandkeramik, LBK), stroked pottery and Rössen cultures.

The beginning of the Linear Pottery culture dates to around 5500 BC. It appears to have spread westwards along the valley of the river Danube and interacted with the cultures of Atlantic Europe when they reached the Paris Basin.

Map of the European Late Neolithic (c. 3500 BC) in Neolithic Europe showing Danubian culture in Yellow

Danubian I peoples cleared forests and cultivated fertile loess soils from the Balkans to the Low Countries and the Paris Basin. They made LBK pottery and kept domesticated cows, pigs, dogs, sheep, and goats. The characteristic tool of the culture is the shoe-last celt, a kind of long thin stone adze which was used to fell trees and sometimes as a weapon, evidenced by the skulls found at Talheim, Neckar in Germany and Schletz in Austria. Settlements consisted of longhouses. According to a theory by Eduard Sangmeister, these settlements were abandoned, possibly as fertile land was exhausted, and then reoccupied perhaps when the land had lain fallow for long enough. In contrast, Peter Modderman and Jens Lüning believe the settlements were constantly inhabited, with individual families using specific plots (Hofplätze). They also imported spondylus shells from the Mediterranean.

A second wave of the culture, which used painted pottery with Asiatic influences, superseded the first phase starting around 4500 BC. This was followed by a third wave which used stroke-ornamented ware.

Danubian sites include those at Bylany in Bohemia and Köln-Lindenthal in Germany.

== See also ==
- Old Europe (archaeology)
- Prehistory of Southeastern Europe
