= Goloring =

Neolithic henge monument in Germany

Coordinates: 50°20′21″N 7°26′23″E

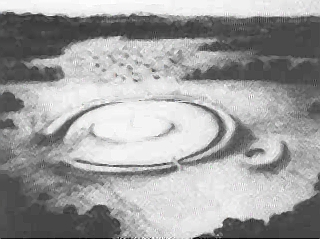
Goloring Reconstruction

The Goloring is an ancient earthworks monument located near Koblenz, Germany. It was created in the Bronze Age era, which dates back to the Urnfield culture (1200–800 BCE.). During this time a widespread solar cult is believed to have existed in Central Europe.

The Goloring consists of a circular ditch of 175 metres in diameter with an outside embankment extending to 190 metres. Technically this makes the structure a henge monument, although the use of the term henge outside of Britain is sometimes disputed. The outside embankment is approx. 7 metres wide and 80 cm high. The ditch has an upper width of 5–6 metres and is approx. 80 cm deep. In the interior one can find a roughly circular leveled platform, which is about elevated by about 1 metre. The platform has been created based on piled gravelled rock and has a diameter of 95 metres. Remnants of a 50 cm thick wooden post with an estimated height of 8–12 metres were excavated in the middle of this platform.

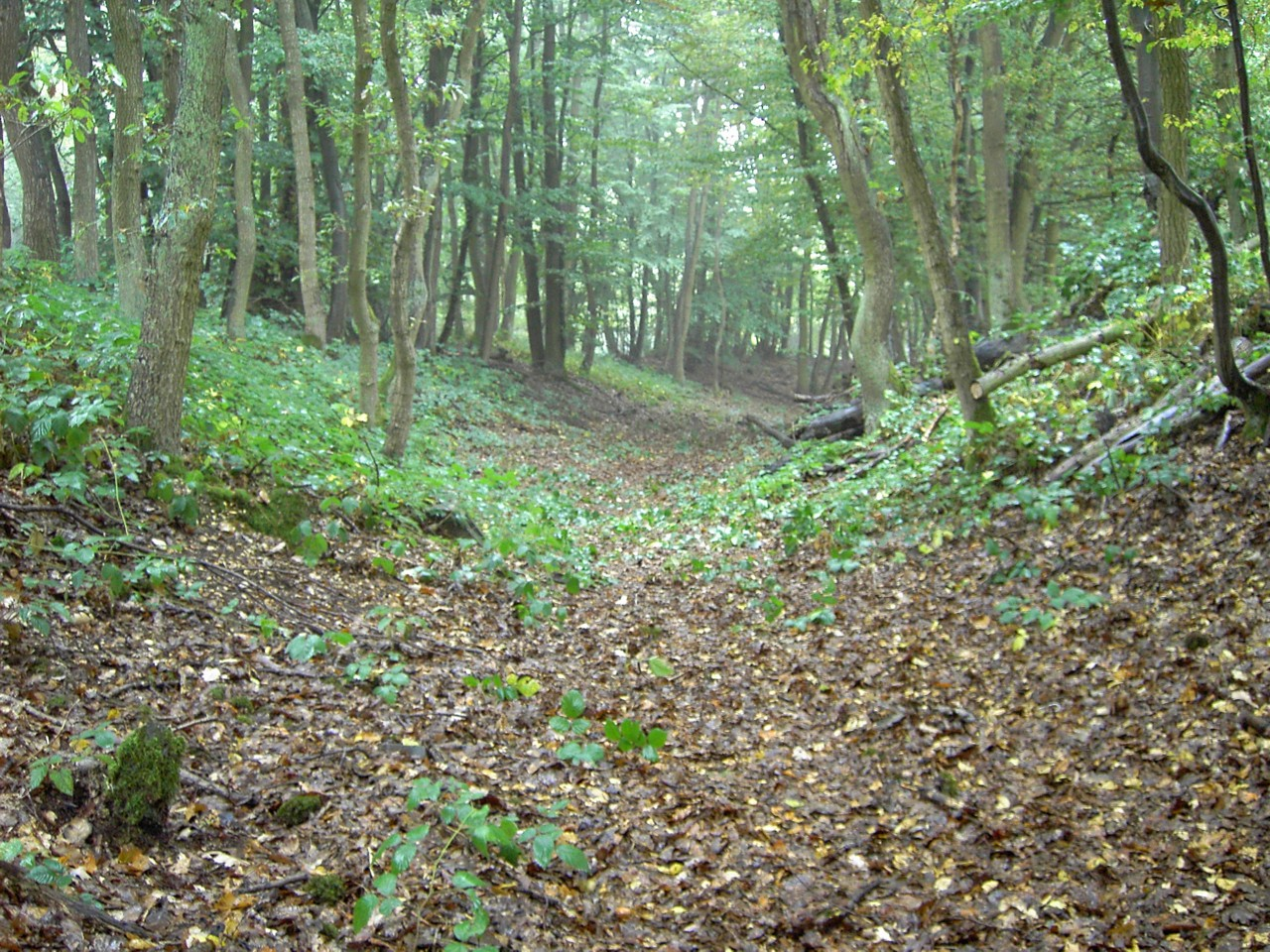
Picture of Goloring Ditch

The design of the ditch is unique in Germany, and makes the earthworks similar to many British monuments of the same era. It is often compared to Stonehenge in England, which has similar diametric proportions.

== Investigations ==
Dr. Josef Röder investigated the Goloring between 1940–48 and detailed his findings in his book The Goloring: An iron-temporal sanctum of the Henge character in the Koberner Forrest. He believed that the central post could be aligned with a nearby volcano to determine certain dates in February, May, August and November each year. These times will have been important for crop farming, and also coincide with Celtic festivals. This may indicate Goloring's use as a calendar, in a similar vein to Stonehenge, Pömmelte and Goseck.

== Location ==
It is located within the boundaries of a former military dog training camp, but was acquired by the town of Kobern-Gondorf in June 2004. The Goloring is currently not accessible to the general public but there are plans under way to build a historic park with the earthworks at its centre.

== See also ==
- Goseck circle
- Stonehenge
- Urnfield Culture
