= Bylany (archaeological site) =

Danubian Neolithic archaeological site in the Czech Republic

- Interactive map of Bylany (archaeological site)
- 49°56′07″N 15°14′30″E
- Cultures: Liner Pottery culture Stroked Pottery culture
- Associated with: Neolithic central Europeans
- Location: Czech Republic
- Region: Bohemia

Site notes
- Elevation: 252 m (827 ft)
- Area: 3.67 km^{2} (1.42 sq mi)
- Architectural style: Neolithic
- Archaeologists: Bohumil Soudský
- Discovered: 1952
- Public access: No public access

Bylany is a Danubian Neolithic (New Stone Age) archaeological site located around 65 km (40 mi) east of Prague in the Czech region of Bohemia. Excavation began in 1955 and work continues today.

Bylany (Bohemia, Czech Republic), in addition to Eythra (Saxony, Germany), Herxheim (Rhineland-Palatinate, Germany), Těšetice (Moravia, Czech Republic), is regarded as the residential area for the first farmers in Europe and one of the largest Neolithic settlements in Central Europe. The area is agricultural and consists of many streams, ravines, and marshlands.

The archaeological site at Bylany was the area of two defining Danubian cultures, the Linear Pottery culture (from German: Linearbandkeramik), often abbreviated as LBK, and the Stroked Pottery culture (from German: Stichbandkeramik), often abbreviated as STK. The LBK culture is theorised to have covered the period between 5600-5000 cal. BC, and the STK culture the period between 5000-4400 cal. BC. These dates are contested, and some archaeologists place the dates of the LBK culture closer to 5500-4900/4950 cal. BC.

Excavations and studies over the years have unearthed many artefacts of the Neolithic period. These include pottery fragments (LBK and STK origins), and stone tools. Studies have also uncovered non-moveable features of the period these include longhouses and rondels identified using non-destructive methodologies i.e. aerial and geophysical prospection, and other methods such as magneto-metric analysis. Pottery is used by archaeologists to determine the chronology of events at Bylany as the differing of styles and techniques to decorate and create suggests the time period and culture that produced the artefact. Czech archaeologists in Prague have sort to make a digitised museum to present the site to a global audience. This has been accomplished by using technologies such as Optical 3D scanning, 3D photogrammetry, and 3D modelling.

== Landscape ==
The landscape of the area is agricultural in its nature. The most common soil in the settlement area is a fertile brown earth on a loess base. The sections of the site are separated by streams, ravines, or marshland.

== Cultures ==
The Czech Republic is a Central European country, the site at Bylany was once the home to the oldest agricultural population of the Neolithic period in this section of Europe. Pottery varying in its decorative styling is the only artefact that can delineate the precise chronology of the Neolithic cultures at Bylany. Information centring on the cultural populations within the Neolithic settlements are not solidified with some archaeologists suggesting that the populations were not "culturally unified" but rather a diverse group of inhabitants. The multiformity is proposed in theory to not be isolated just to social aspects but to be associated with economic or subsistence characteristics.

=== Linear Pottery Culture ===
The Linear Pottery culture (LBK) comes from the German word 'Linearbandkeramik', which translates to 'linear band pottery'. The name is derived from the style of pottery decoration used by the culture, more so the incised lines or bands. Bylany is one of the largest LBK settlements in central Europe. The genesis of the LBK is thought to be in the Carpathian basin. Estimates place the culture at the site at around 5600-5500 cal. BC until approximately 5000-4900 cal. BC. The LBK period at Bylany is thought to have had 25 settlement phases.

=== Stroked Pottery Culture ===
The Stroked Pottery culture (STK), originating from the German word 'Stichbandkeramik' translating into English "Stitch band pottery", was the successor to the LBK. The culture gets its name from the different style of pottery decoration used, which was the narrower engraved lines, increased density of strokes, and proliferation of engraved lines with punctures. The estimated timeline of the culture is the period between 5000 cal. BC and 4400 cal. BC. These dates are conflicted with one study suggesting the date is 4950-4400 cal. BC.

== Artefacts ==
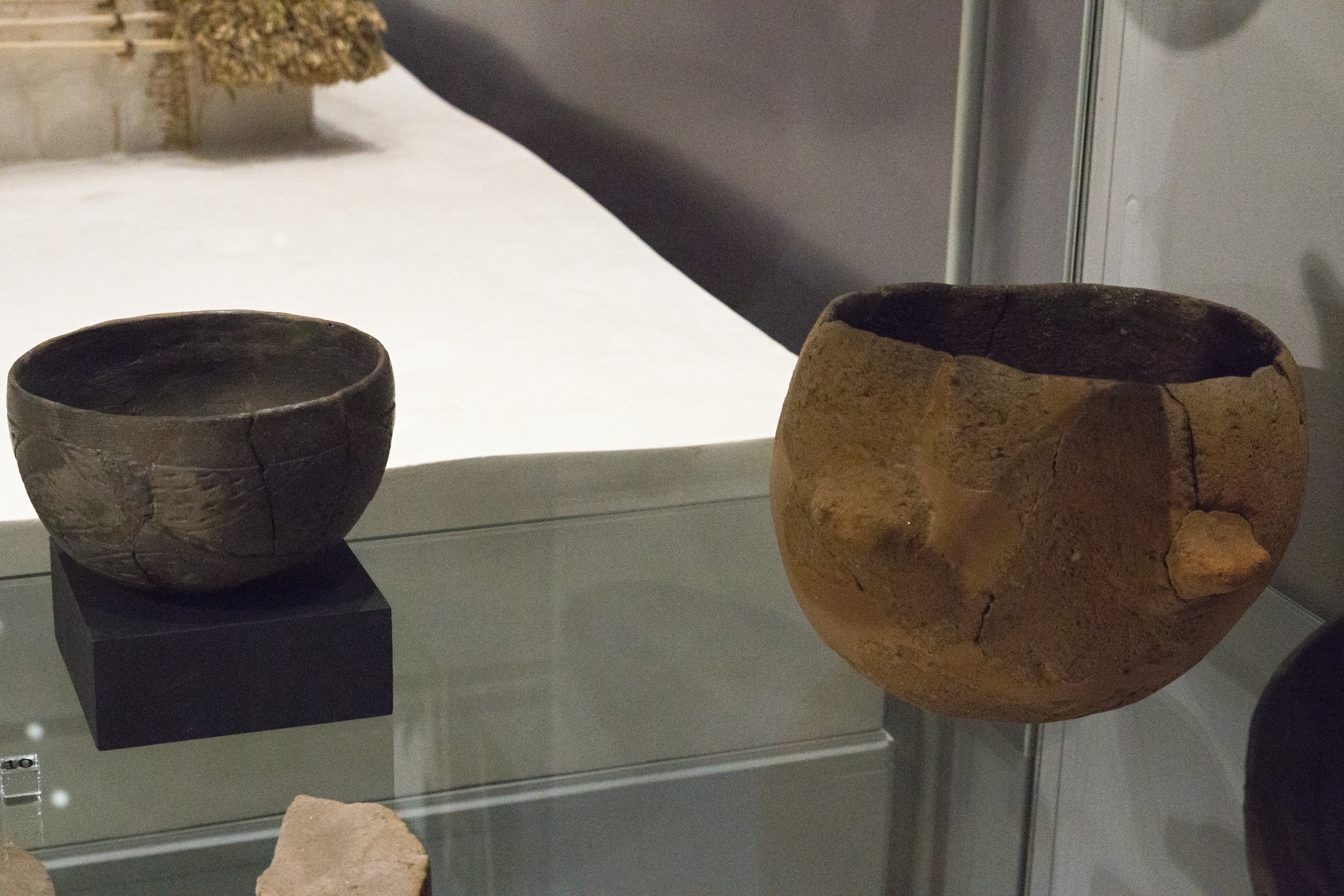
Common Linear Band pottery of Western Bohemia.

Since the first excavations in the 1950s, the archaeological site at Bylany has yielded a varying degree of Neolithic artefacts including pottery fragments, lithics, grinding tools, chipped stone (flints), polished stone (axes and adzes), whetstones (abrading, smoothing, and polishing tools), hand stones, and non-moveable pits, postholes, and ditches.

=== Pottery ===
The changing of pottery style is the feature that defines the chronology of the LBK and STK cultures. The pottery differs in decorative features with both cultures using numerous characteristics that differentiated one another. LBK cultures can be seen to have used engraved broad grooves, engraved lines, engraved bands filled with punctures, engraved lines with punctures, dense punctures on a very fine engraved line, independent punctures, and engraved lines with adjacent punctures. The STK cultures began to use narrower engraved lines, increased density of strokes, and proliferation of engraved lines with punctures.

==== Types of pottery ====
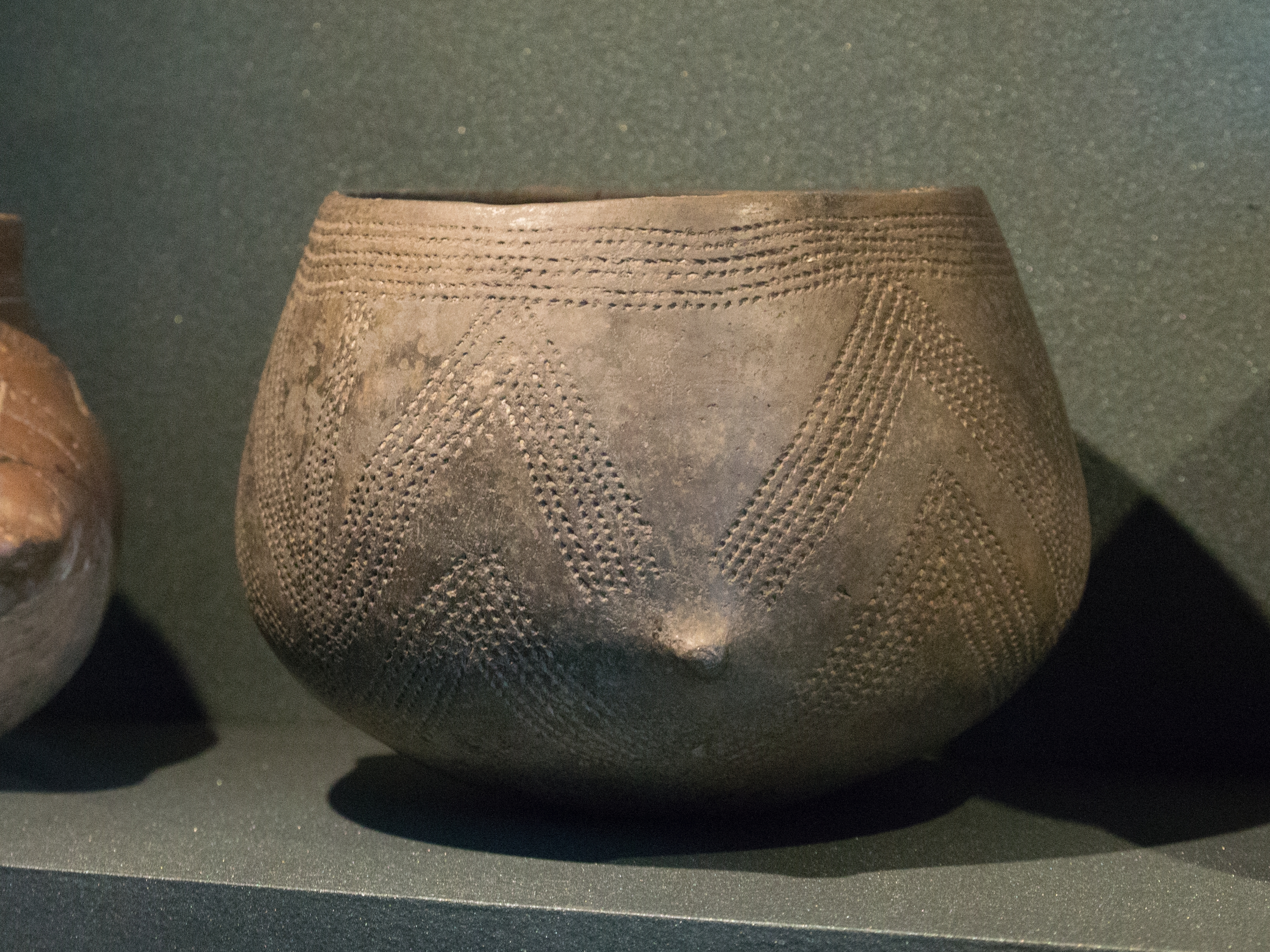
An example of pottery crafted by the Stroked Pottery culture.

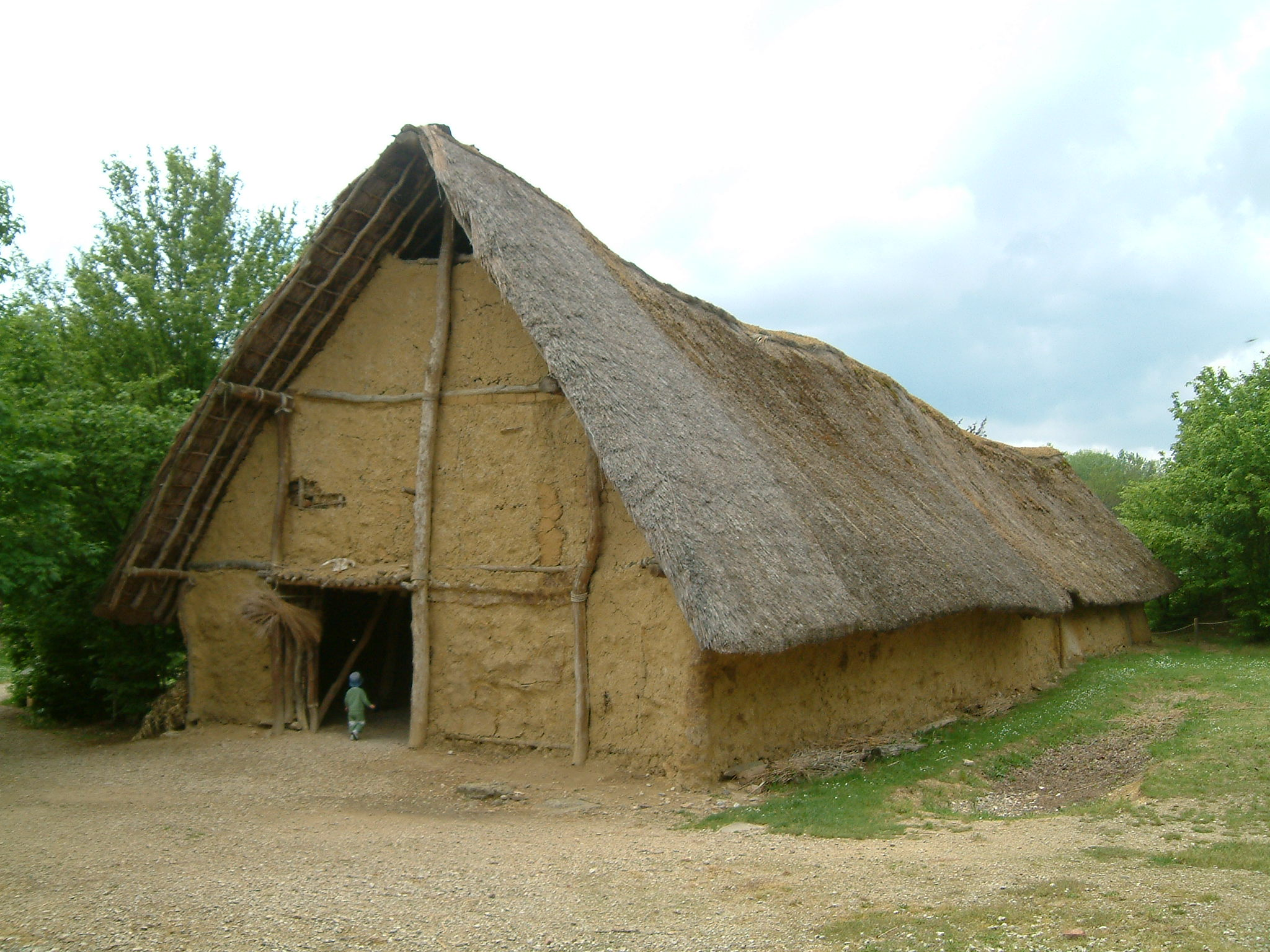
A generalised Neolithic longhouse that would be found at Neolithic sites such as Bylany.

Two units of pottery were created; coarse ceramics (course ware) and fine ceramics (fine ware), both with individual uses in society. Course ware can be identified by its course, thick walls, whereas fine ware was of an elegant appearance typically with engraved linear decorations. Fine ware is thought to have needed a great proficiency as the decorations were more complex (incised lines), whereas course ware did not necessary demand this skill. Various cases have found that LBK and STK fine ware share commonalities. Course ware is theorised to have been used for food preparation, storage, and packaging. Fine ware in contrast is believed to have been used for food consumption.

==== Manufacturing techniques ====
Archaeologists use modern technology such as micro-tomography (uCT) as one way to determine the manufacturing technique used to create the pottery. This technique was created to visualise the inner structure of i.e. pottery sherds. The digital creation shows the porous structure and geometrical parameters (total porosity, pore size distribution and pore shape). This technique is able to identify the organic temper in cases where all the organic material is burnt due to the firing process in hardening the pottery paste.

LBK Neolithic pottery was created by a facet of techniques. One technique is the coiling of the potters clay. The clay is rolled out into a cylindrical shape. The clay is then coiled and layered onto one another forming any basic or more complex structure desired.

Archaeologists theorise techniques in which the pottery was tempered. One theorised technique is adding cow-dung in varying ratios to be used for tempering the clay, this may increase the clays plasticity. A modern study tested the hypothesis that dung was used in the crafting of pottery. The study suggests that the "presence of gel-forming hydrated organic polymers increases the clay's plasticity". The porous nature of the resultant vessel may also serve to preserve water in warmer condition as the pot keeps the contents cool by permitting slow evaporation through the porous walls. Other organic tempering materials may have been used by the LBK such as wood and straw, these materials leave voids in the pottery with specific morphology.

==== Atypical pottery ====
Socio-economic status and or newcomers from other LBK settlements are theorised to have produced atypical decorations on pottery. This theory is postulated on the basis that the finding of these types of fragments are in smaller houses.

=== Structures ===
None of the physical structures remain from the Neolithic period at Bylany, rather they have left imprints to the likes of pits, post holes, grooves and foundation trenches in the ground and archaeologist are able to decrypt their formal and spatial relationship.

==== Longhouses ====
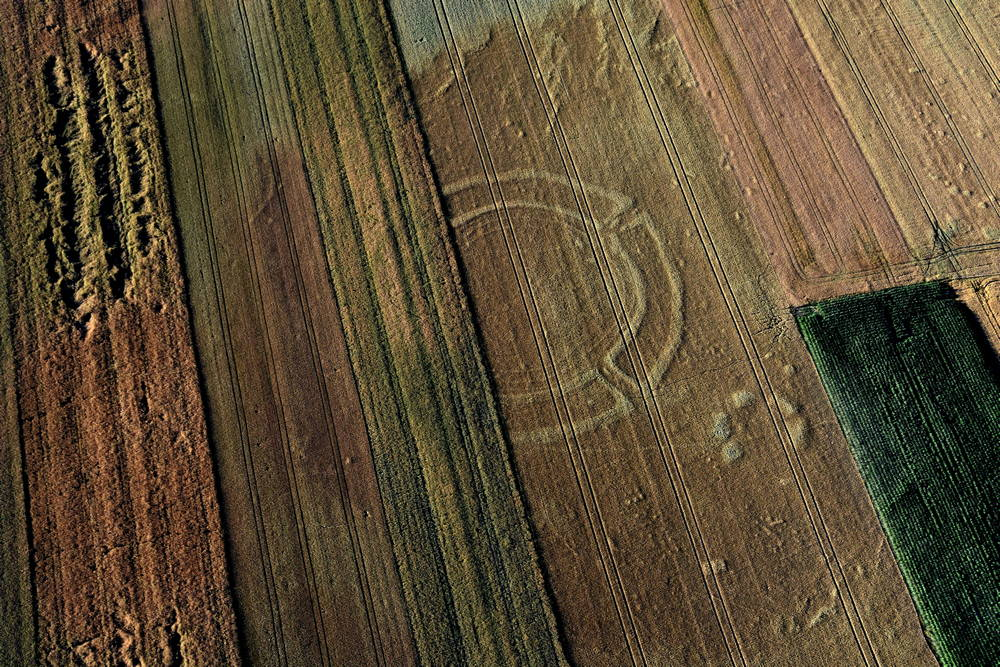
An aerial image of a Neolithic rondel.

One common structure includes longhouses, referred to as European Neolithic longhouses, which were made of wooden timber framing and wattle daub walls and typically ranged in length between four and fifty meters, with early studies (1950s) and more recent (2013) studies placing the average between six and twenty meters. Long houses were typically a quadrangular shape. The elevation of these structures is debated, as it is unknown if the houses were on terrain level or elevated. Long houses are thought to have originated in the Carpathian basin, specifically in western Hungary. Past research suggested that longhouses were rather from the western section of central Europe, as this type of finding was rare in the Carpathian basin. Recent excavations in Transdanubia (Hungry) has provided evidence of sedentary life and the formative period. It uncovered the earliest Central European house type. Extensive excavations in the Balaton region and across Transdanubia have also revealed 45,050 LBK houses (arranged in regular rows). The finding of LBK houses in the Transdanubia has risen ten-fold.

==== Rondels ====
A typical structure in agricultural areas of Central Europe (including Bylany) are rondels, sometimes referred to as earthworks enclosures, circular ditched enclosures, or Kreisgrabenanlagen. They are circular ditched enclosures, usually with palisades forming what is speculated to be some sort of defensive structure. Rondels date to at least the fifth millennium BC and can be associated with both the LBK and STK cultures. The artefacts were identified using non-destructive methods i.e. aerial or geophysical prospection. Issues arise with these methodologies as the thick layer of loess beneath the topsoil does not allow for clear visualisation of these features. Some studies have opted to use magneto-metric (Geometrics G-806 and G-816 proton magnetometers, Geoscan Research FM-36 single fluxgate gradiometer, and the Magneto-Arch five-channel fluxgate gradiometer system with FMG-650B fluxgate gradiometer) surveying techniques. The Bohemia region alone has uncovered 30 Neolithic rondels, archaeologist are adamant that there are a greater number yet to be discovered. In the 1980s the postulated and "archaeologically anticipated" double ditched circular enclosure was documented. The specifications for the double ditched enclosure were: Inner ditch 90m diameter, 2.2m width, and a 1.3m depth; Outer ditch 110m diameter, 2.4m width, and a 1.3m depth. Later studies (1990-1992) identified a third outer ditch, which was considered to be irregular.

== Modernisation of the Bylany site ==
A point cloud created by a three-dimensional scanning device.

Czech archaeologists from the Institute of Archaeology (Prague) argued that the Neolithic site at Bylany was virtually "invisible", meaning it was indistinguishable from the modern landscape, to the public. This is due to the artefacts and evidence of the LBK and STK cultures being buried underneath layers of earth. This is also the case for other Neolithic sites in Europe (Eythra, Herxheim, and Těšetice). They sort to modernise the typical "brick and mortar" museums, which "seek visitors only from within a limited target group", and used modern technologies, optical 3D scanning, 3D Photogrammetry, and 3D Modelling, to create digital composites which formed a virtual gallery or virtual museum. The composed artefacts can display textual, visual, and spatial characters building a virtual three-dimensional artefact (e.g., pottery, lithics and grinding tools), which can be accessed via e.g. a portal electronic device (smartphone, tablet, and laptop). Providing a further explanation that the "rapid advances of information technologies globally (high speed internet and computers etc.) created room for a change".

=== Optical 3D scanning ===
Optical 3D scanning is not new in the field of archaeology. It can scan an object or environment and create a point cloud of the sample, which can be reconstructed to create a three-dimensional image which can, if chosen, display colour and texture. This type of device has the advantage of creating realistic spatial models of the artefact. The device used in this study was the smartSCAN-3D scanner.

=== 3D photogrammetry ===
Multi-image photogrammetry uses multiple images in conjunction with specific software to create three-dimensional objects. This study used Photomodeler and ImageMaster as the processing software. It has enabled archaeologists to digitise immovable objects.

=== 3D modelling ===
Three-dimensional models are created using the two-dimensional data i.e., floor plans and aerial photos. After a preliminary image is created extra layers are added such as the roofing, string walls and interior and exterior equipment. The authors of this report opted to use the programme Blender (open source).

=== Importance ===
The Neolithic period (9500 cal. BC – 1900 cal. BC), which current evidence (cultivation and animal domestication) suggests began in southwest Asia in 9500 cal. BC, changed the way we as human survived and diminished the necessity of hunting and gathering with the adoption of farming and animal keeping. Evidence found at Bylany (settlement agglomeration) and even Eythra (wooden water wells), Herxheim (rondels with human remains), and Těšetice (circle wall enclosures), have shifted the insight into the first European farmers.
