= Goseck Circle =

Neolithic henge monument

- Sonnenobservatorium Goseck (German)
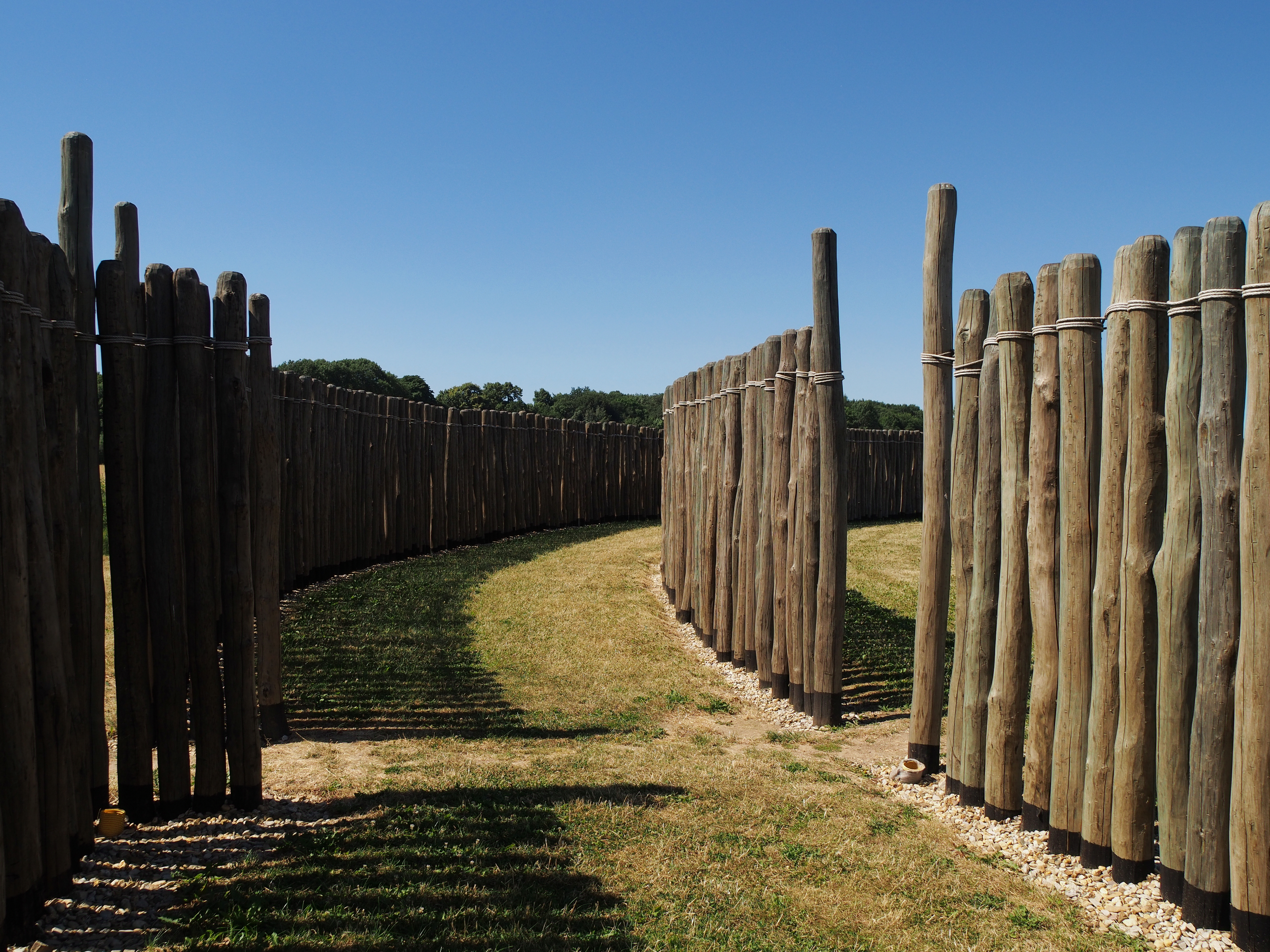
- A view inside the reconstructed wooden palisade of the circle

- Location in Germany
- 51°11′54″N 11°51′53″E
- Type: Circular Enclosure
- Periods: Neolithic
- Location: Goseck, Saxony-Anhalt, Germany

History
- Built: c. 4900 BC

Site notes
- Diameter: 75 m (246 ft)
- Excavation dates: 2002-2005
- Discovered: 1991 by Otto Braasch
- Condition: Reconstructed
- Public access: Yes

The Goseck Circle (German: Sonnenobservatorium Goseck) is a Neolithic structure in Goseck in the Burgenlandkreis district in Saxony-Anhalt, Germany.

It was constructed around 4900 BC, and appears to have remained in use until around 4700 BC. Thus, it may be the oldest and best known of the circular enclosures associated with the Central European Neolithic. Currently, the site is presented officially by the state archaeologists and the local association that looks after it as a ritual or cult structure.

The circle consists of a concentric ditch 75 metres (246 feet) across and two palisade rings containing entrances in places aligned with sunrise and sunset on the winter solstice days and smaller entrances aligned with the summer solstice. Marketing materials have described the site as one of the oldest "Solar observatories" in the world, but sunrise and sunset during winter and summer solstices are the only evident astronomical alignments emphasized in the remains of the structure.

The existence of the site was made public in August 2003. It was opened for visitors in December 2005.

== Geography ==
=== Location ===
The site is located on farmland in Goseck, in the Burgenlandkreis of Saxony-Anhalt, between Naumburg and Weißenfels. The circle sits on a piece of land that gradually rises toward the south, not far from where the Unstrut flows into the Saale, at the border of the region known as Leipzig Bay.

== History ==
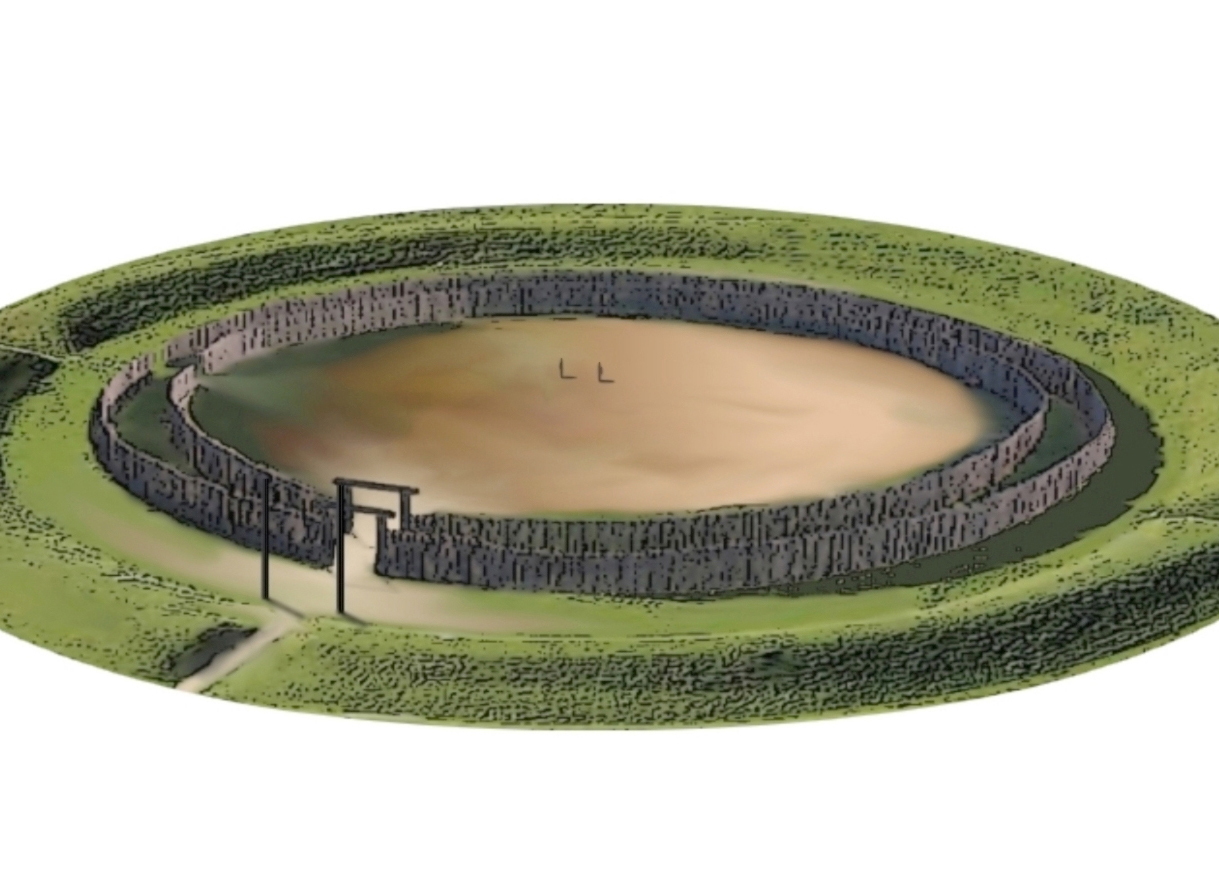
Goseck circle

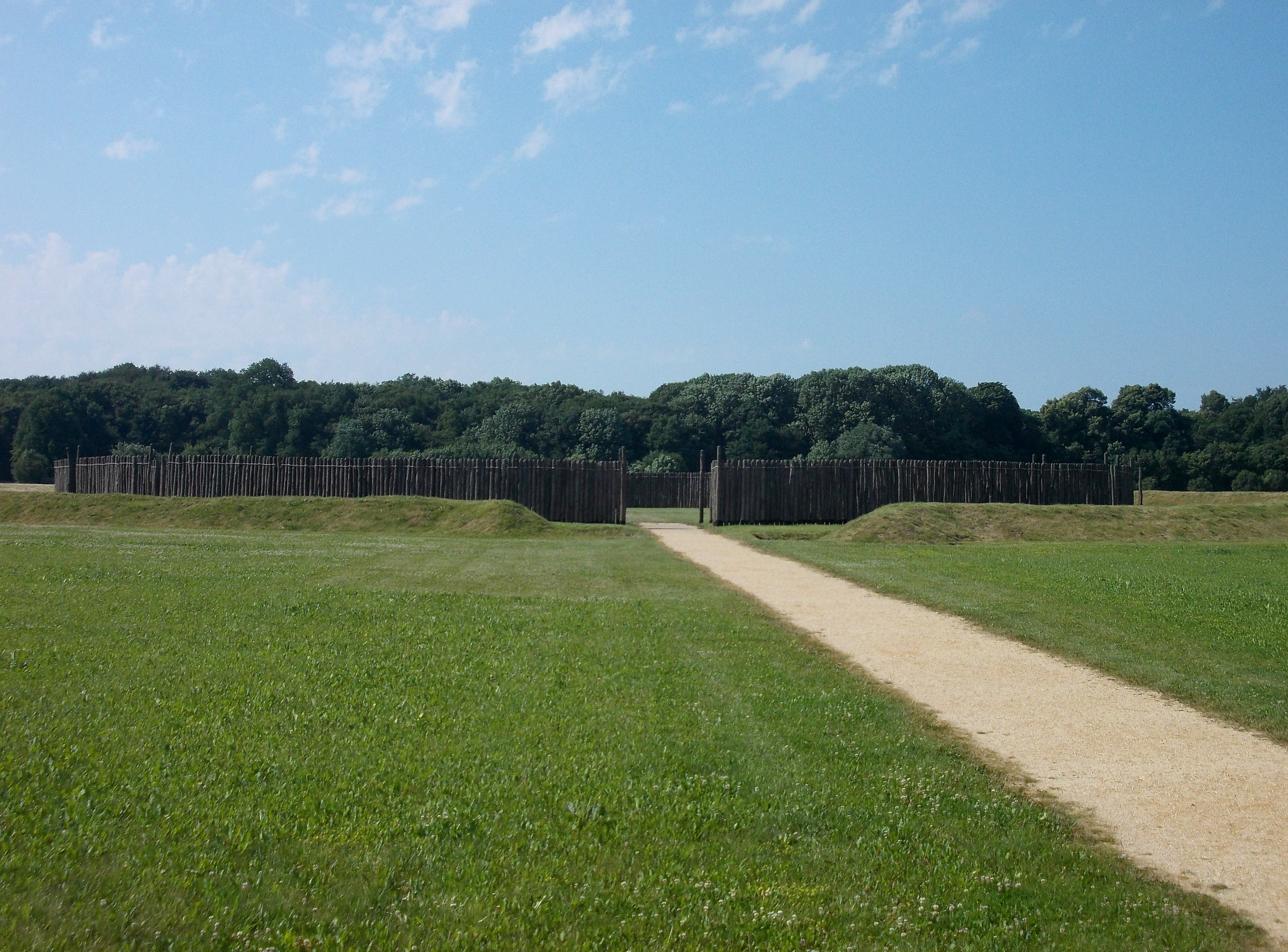
Goseck circle reconstruction

=== Discovery and excavation ===
The circle was discovered in 1991 by Otto Braasch on an aerial survey photograph that showed circular ridges under a wheat field. The cropmarks were easy to see in a season of drought. The structure's visibility also indicated an advanced state of erosion.

To preserve the endangered remains, the Landesamt für Denkmalpflege und Archäologie Sachsen-Anhalt decided to conduct an excavation. It cooperated with the Institute for Prehistoric Archaeology of the University of Halle-Wittenberg.

François Bertemes and Peter Biehl began a major excavation of the site in 2002. When archaeologists combined the evidence with GPS observations, they noticed that the two southern openings marked the sunrise and sunset of the winter and summer solstices.

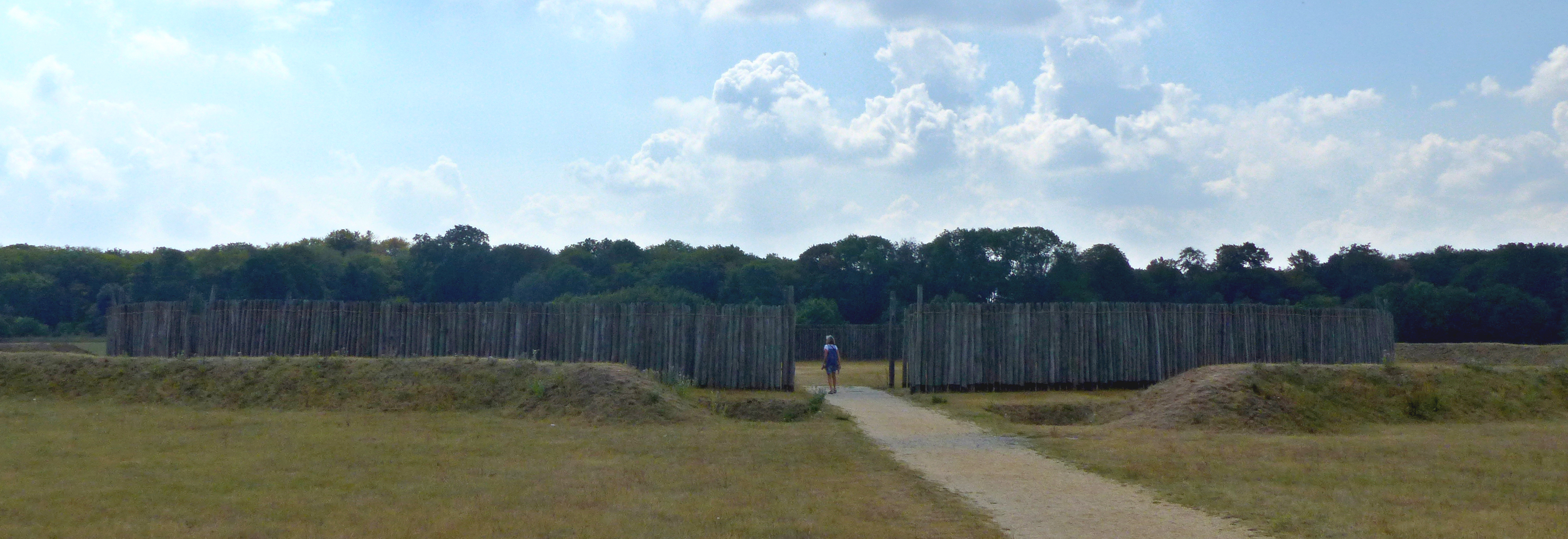
Goseck circle reconstruction

Radiocarbon dating places the construction of the site close to 4900 BC, while the style of the pottery shards associate it with the stroke-ornamented ware culture of ca. 4700 BC, suggesting that the site remained in use throughout two or three centuries.

Excavators also found the remains of what may have been ritual fires, animal and human bones, and a headless skeleton near the southeastern gate, that could be interpreted as evidence of a specific burial ritual or of human sacrifice.

Bertemes and Biehl continued the excavation for a few weeks each year. In 2004, a group from the University of California, Berkeley joined the ongoing dig.

Since the end of the excavation, the site has been reconstructed. Archaeologists and state officials have rebuilt the wooden palisade of the circle using 1,675 oak poles with a height of 2.5 meters. Woodworkers worked with hand tools so that the wooden posts would look authentic. The site was opened to the public on 21 December 2005, the day of the winter solstice.

== Description ==
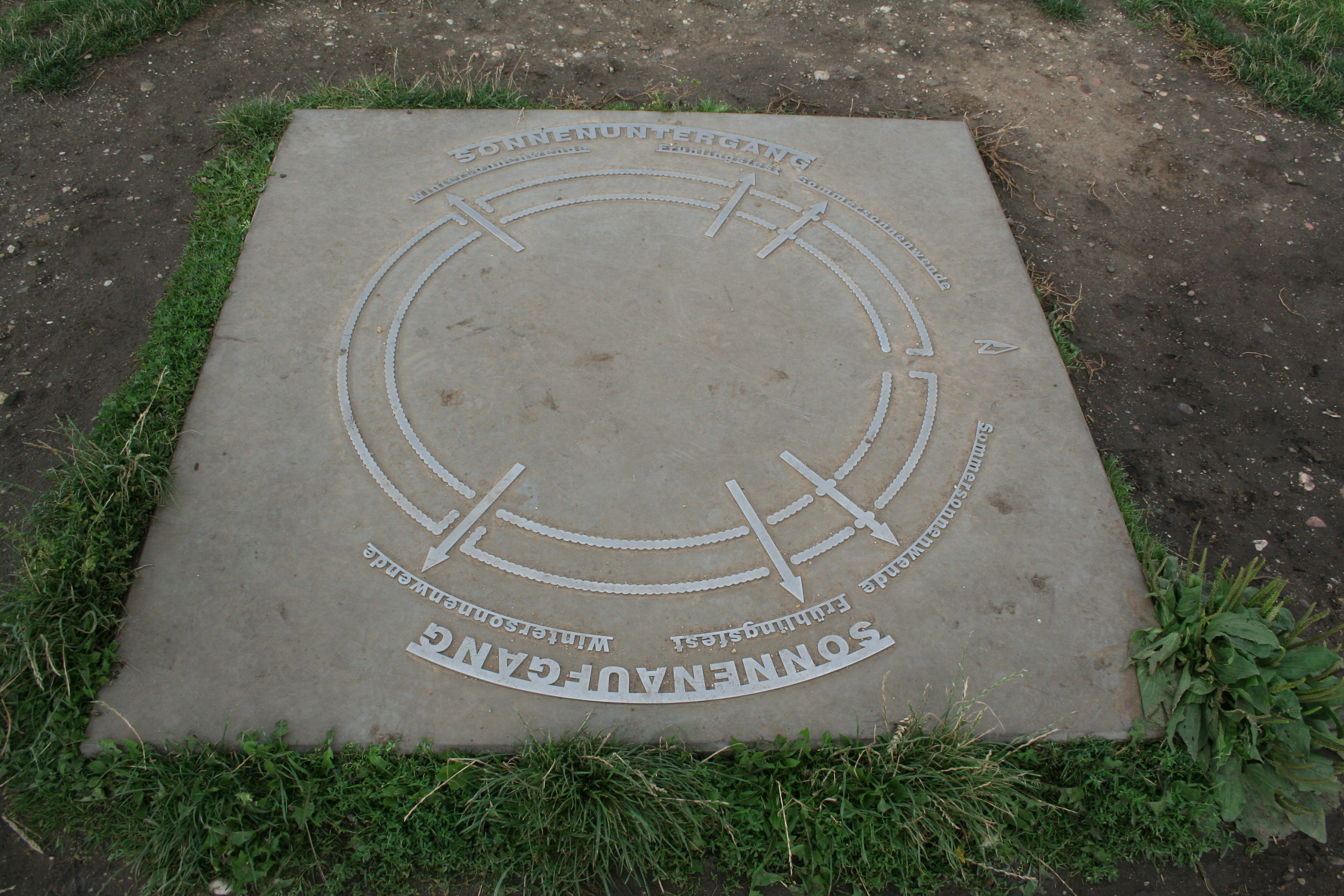
Tile in the centre of the site showing axis alignment of the structure

The site is surrounded by a circular v-shaped moat of up to 1.8 meters in depth. The soil was used to create a rampart on the outside. The diameter of the moat is 75 meters, measured from its external border. A double wooden palisade stood inside the moat. No traces of internal buildings were found. Entry to the site was via three symmetrical main entrances to the north, southwest, and southeast. In addition there were small gaps in the palisades allowing access. The moat followed the three main entries outward (see diagram). The entrances in the inner palisade were narrower than those in the outer, which in turn, were narrower than the gap in the moat.

The southwestern and southeastern entrances face the direction of sunset and sunrise around the date of the winter solstice. Two of the smaller breaks in the wall face toward the equivalent direction on the summer solstice.

There is no sign of fire or of other destruction. Why the site was abandoned is unknown. Later villagers built a defensive moat following the ditches of the old enclosure.

== Astronomical alignment and interpretation ==
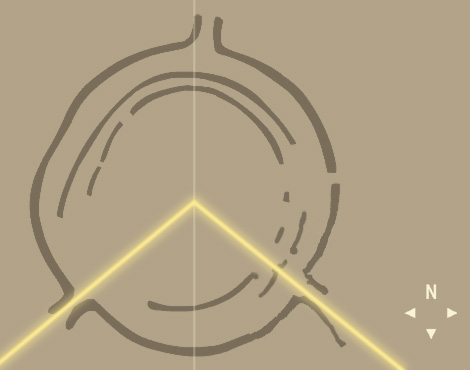
Drawing of the Goseck circle - yellow lines represent the direction in which the sun rises and sets at the winter solstice, while the vertical line shows the astronomical meridian

The Goseck ring is one of the best preserved and extensively investigated of the many similar structures built around the same time. Approximately 140 of these structures, known as circular enclosures, have been found. Although they all have unique features, they follow a basic architectural principle. Few of them have been excavated.

During a ceremony at the first opening of this site to the public, state archaeologist Harald Meller called it "a milestone in archaeological research".

Its construction is dated to approximately 4900 BC, and it seems to have remained in use until about 4700 BC. This corresponds to the transitional phase between the Neolithic Linear Pottery and Stroke-ornamented ware cultures. The site is one of a larger group of circular enclosures in the Elbe and Danube region, most of which show similar solstice alignments.

There has been some debate about whether the site was used to monitor the sun throughout the year or only on specific notable days, and thus about whether calling the site a "solar observatory" is appropriate. It has been suggested that the inaccurate name was adopted primarily for marketing purposes. Archaeologist Ralf Schwarz suggests the structures at the site allowed coordinating an easily judged lunar calendar with the more demanding measurements of a solar calendar through calendar calculations. (Note: See also Atlit Yam and Nabta Playa stone circles, which are also potentially aligned to astronomical bodies.)

== Today ==
The reconstructed site is open to the public. An information point has been opened at nearby Schloss Goseck, featuring an exhibit and information on the excavations. The site is maintained by the Verein Gosecker Sonnenobservatorium e.V..

Goseck is a stop on the tourist route, Himmelswege, linking archaeological sites in Saxony-Anhalt.

== See also ==
- Neolithic circular enclosures in Central Europe
- Stonehenge
- Pömmelte
- Glauberg
- Goloring
- Mnajdra
- Calendar Circle of Nabta Playa (Africa, Nubia-Egypt border region)
- List of archaeoastronomical sites by country
