= Shoe-last celt =

Stone tool for woodworking

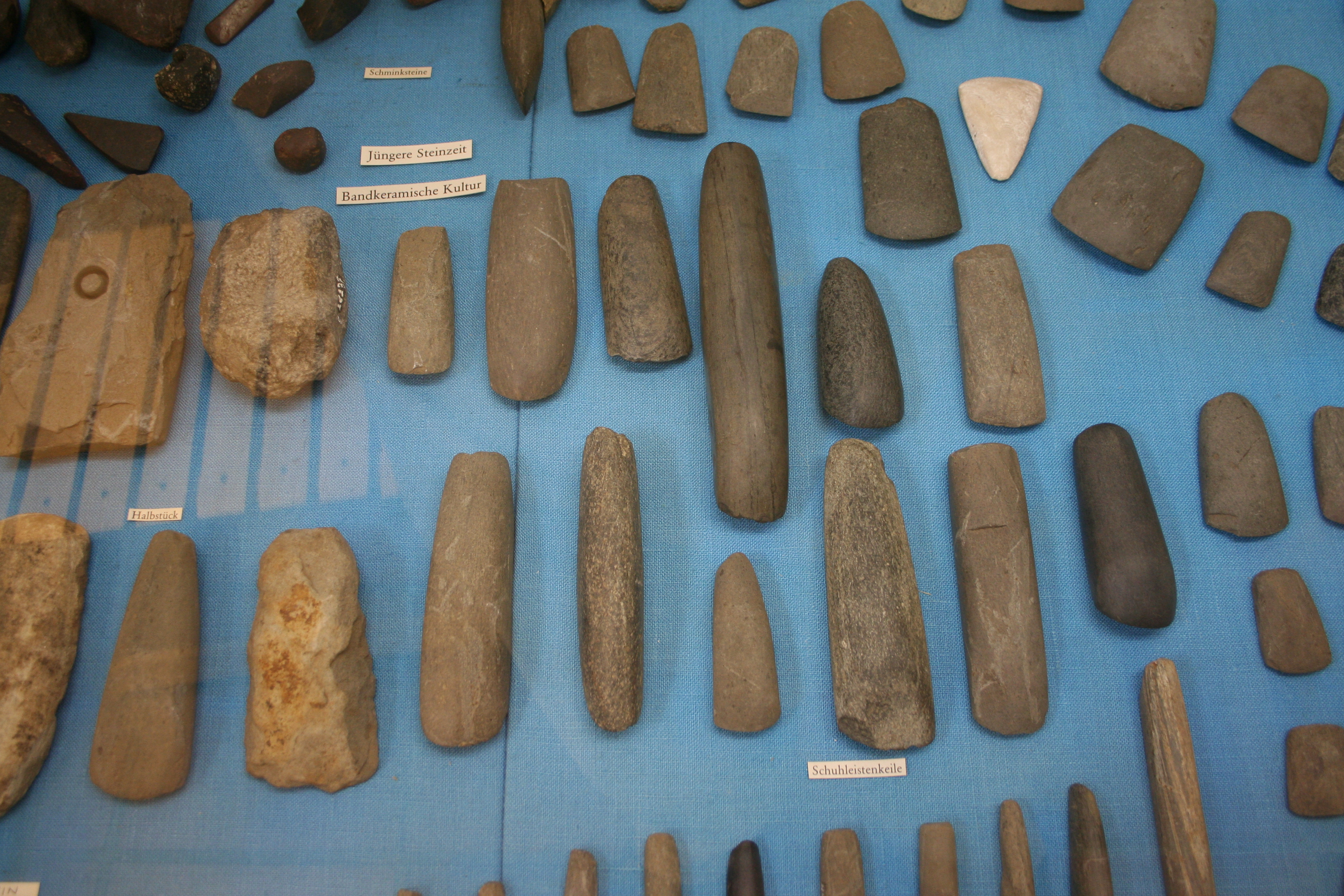
Shoe-last celts at the Fritzlar regional museum, Hesse, Germany

A shoe-last celt (German: Schuhleistenkeil) is a long thin polished stone tool for felling trees and woodworking, characteristic of the early Neolithic Linearbandkeramik and Hinkelstein cultures, also called Danubian I in the older literature.

== Appearance ==
The tools are square in profile with a rounded top, which is why they are compared with shoe makers' lasts. The preferred material is amphibolite; basalt is also used.

== Typology ==
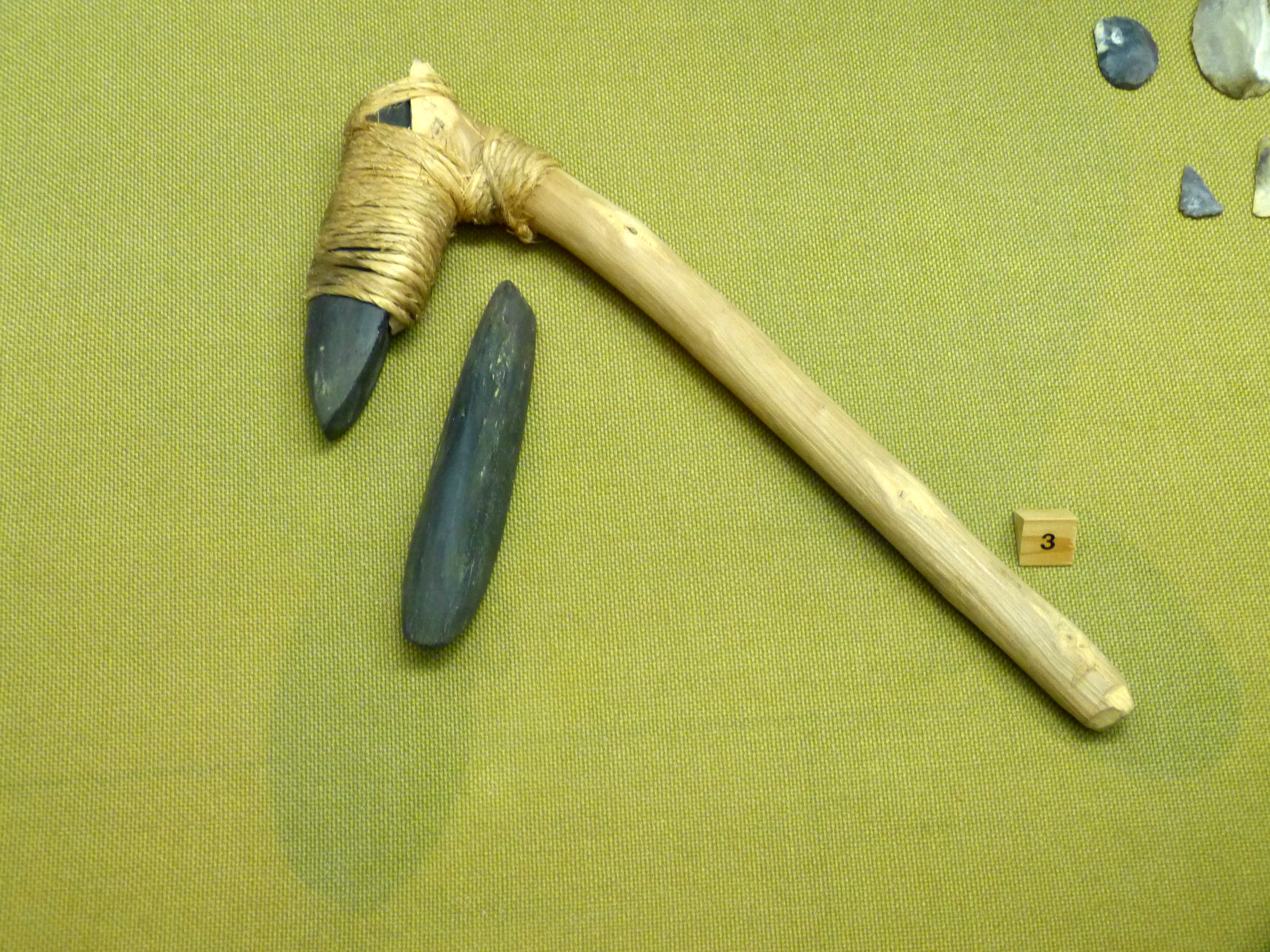
Reconstructed hafted shoe-last stone axe - from a stilt house village at Gaienhofen-Untergarten, Germany

In regards to the typology of Neolithic adzes, initially two types were distinguished,

When width exceeds thickness they were named flat adzes (Flachhacke), when thickness exceeds width shoe-last adzes (Schuhleistenkeile), or high adzes. Within the latter group a distinction is sometimes made between intermediate Flomborn adzes and the higher Hinkelstein adzes (Buttler 1938; Bakels 1987; Merkel 1999). Later, subdivisions were made on the basis of metric characteristics into two groups (Schietzel 1965), six groups (Modderman 1970, 184) and finally two groups again (Dohrn-Ihmig 1983). All typologies were based on the width-height ratio, while Modderman added the absolute dimension. The wide variation, from small to large and from flat to high adzes, certainly reflects a functional differentiation, but the various types do not appear to be of chronological significance.

== Use ==
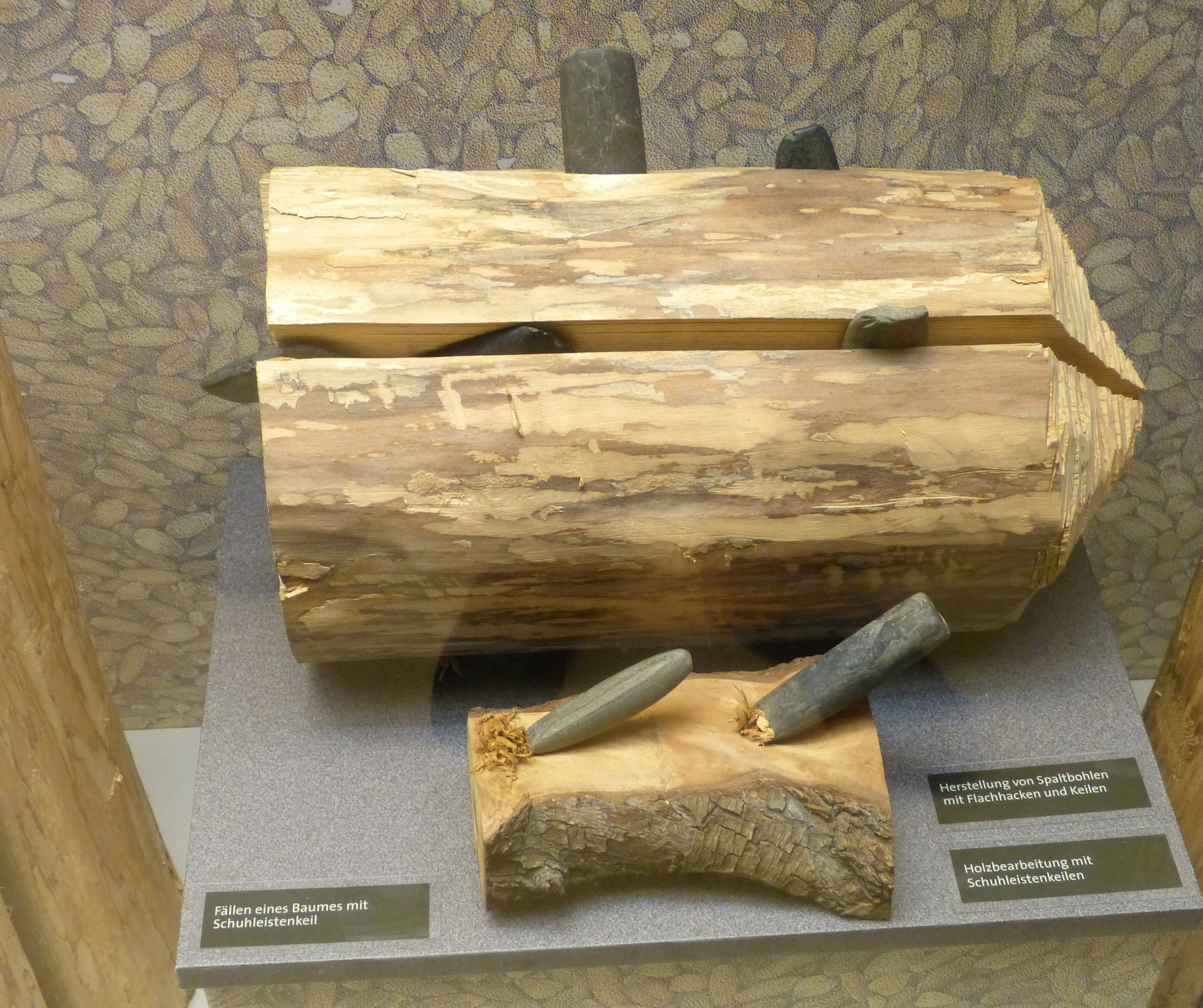
Ancient woodworking with shoe-last celts - Thuringia Prehistory Museum, Weimar, Germany

The polished stone axe or adze introduced a new way of life to Central Europe in mid-sixth millennium BC. It was a tool that was necessary for the clearing of the land to create fields and to build houses. These adzes were also used for the manufacture of agricultural tools, and any other wooden objects.

Shape and wear show that the celts were used as adzes to fell trees and to work wood. Some blades have traces of hafting as well. The finds from the wells of Kückhoven and Eythra in Germany demonstrate a high standard of carpentry. Shoe-last celts have also been used as weapons, as attested by smashed skulls from Schletz (Austria) and Talheim, Neckar (Germany). An older theory suggests their use as hoes, but there are no wear traces to support this.

Towards the end of the Linear Pottery Culture, around 5000 BC, the first perforated tools appear.

== See also ==
- Celt (tool)
