= Neolithic circular enclosures in Central Europe =

Neolithic earthworks

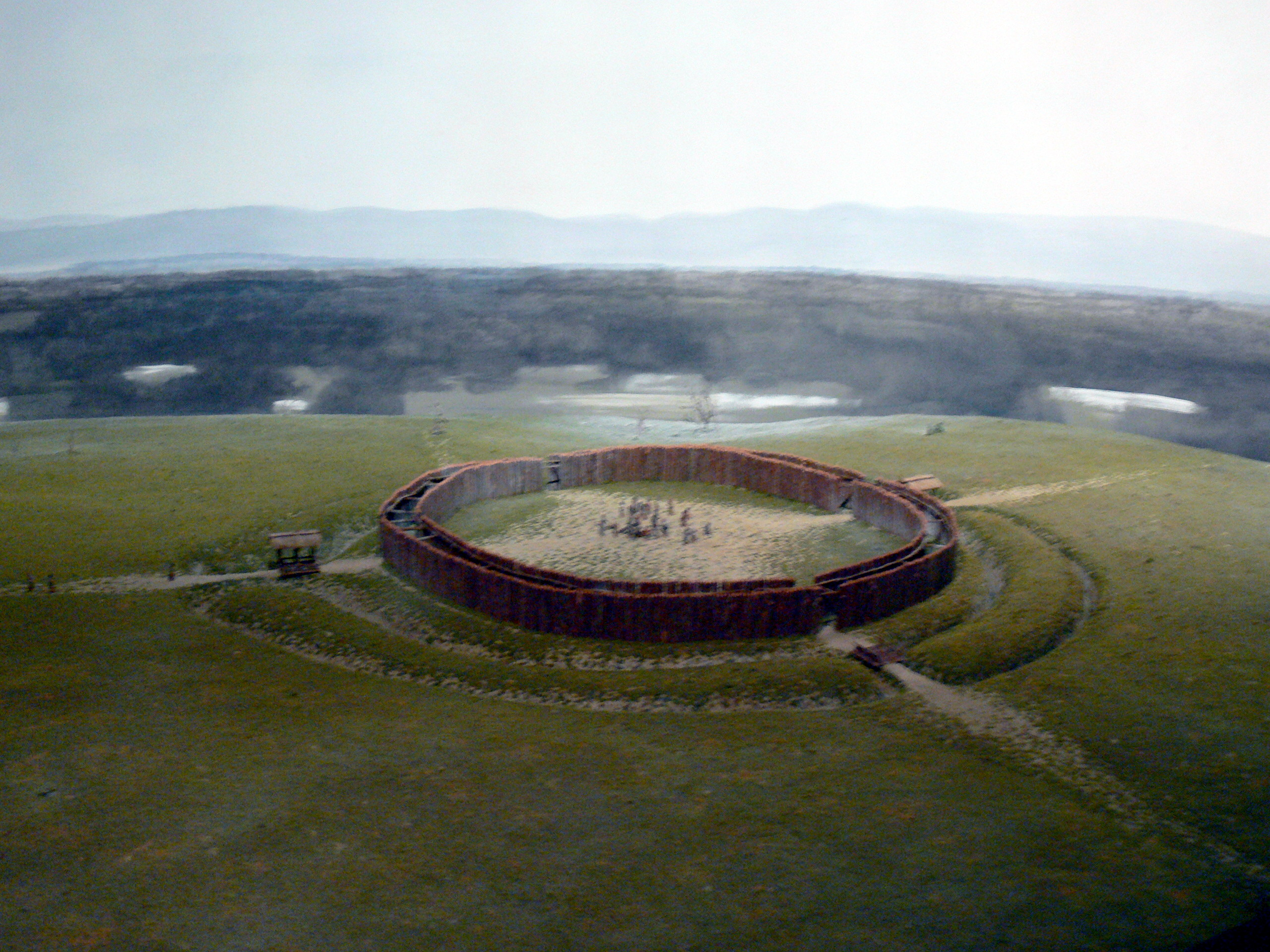
Reconstruction (model) of the Künzing-Unternberg rondel, Museum Quintana, Künzing, Lower Bavaria

Archaeological cultures in Neolithic Europe of the late 5th millennium BC. The Central European cultures associated with roundels (Lengyel, Stroked Pottery, Rössen) are indicated in yellow

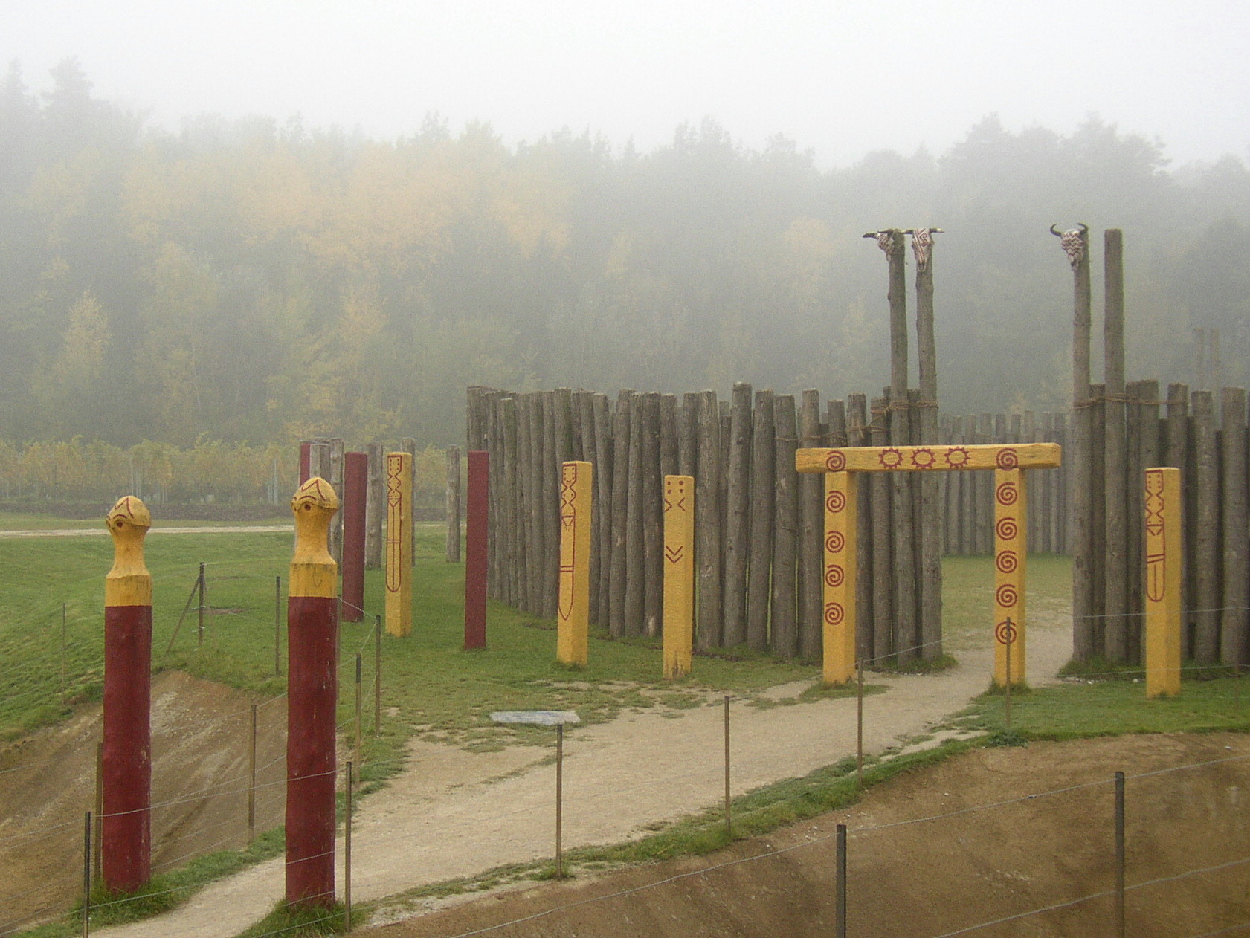
Reconstruction of circular ditches at Heldenberg, Lower Austria

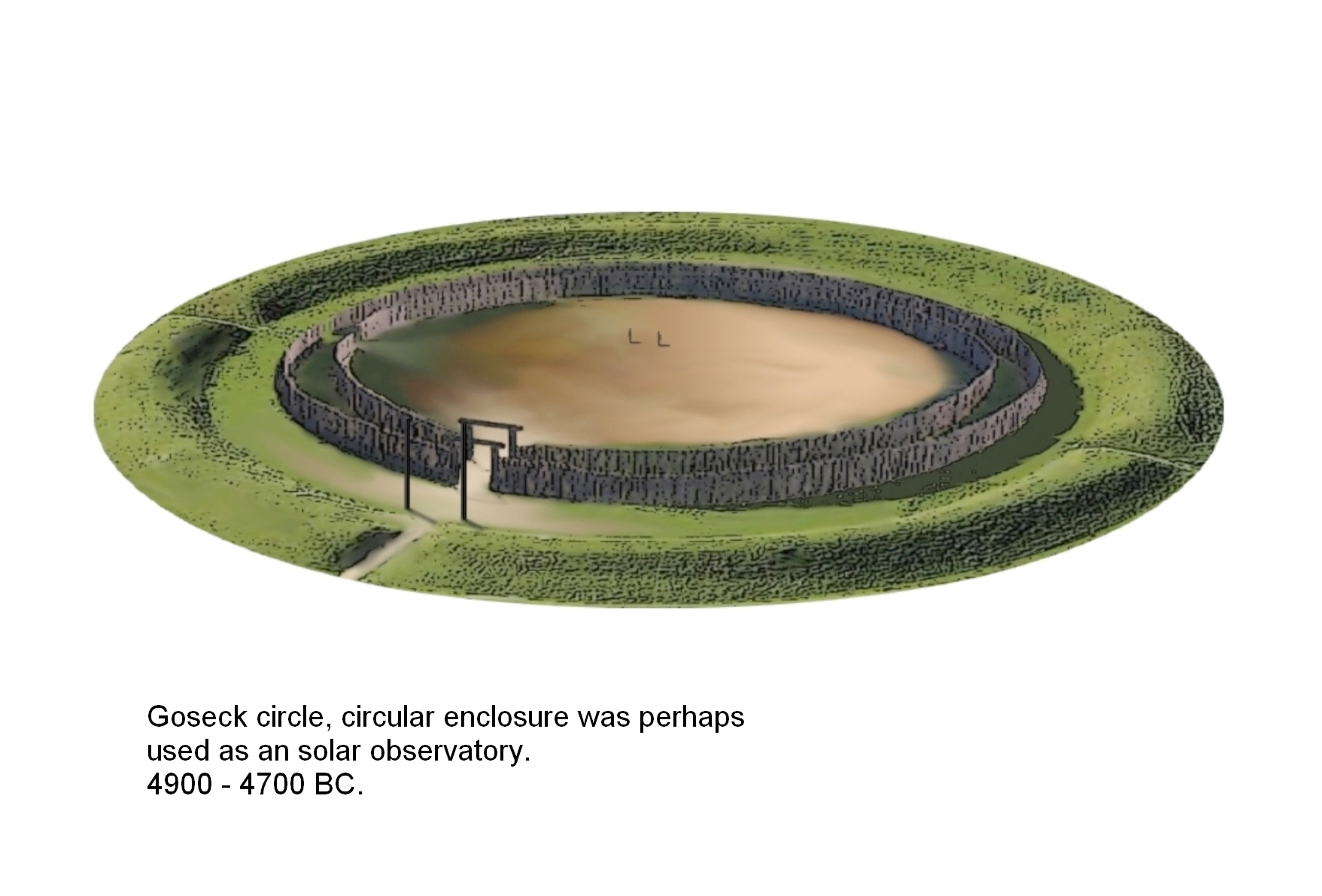
The Goseck circle, Germany

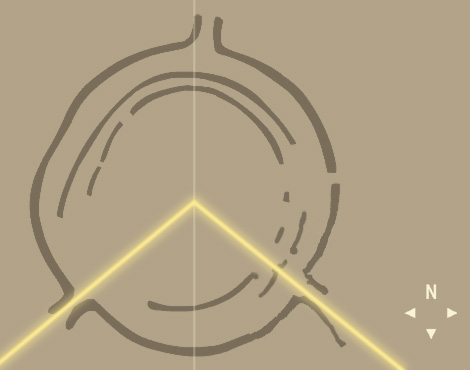
Sketch of the layout of the Goseck circle, with indication of the direction of sunrise and sunset on winter solstice

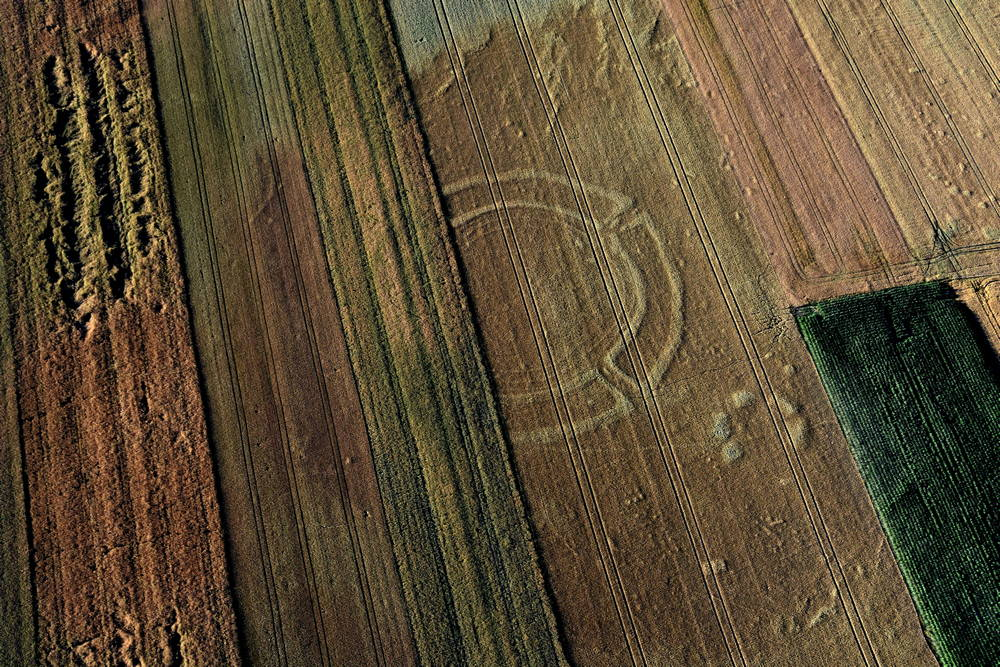
Aerial image of a Neolithic rondel enclosure from Drzemlikowice, SW Poland

Approximately 120–150 Neolithic earthworks enclosures are known in Central Europe. They are called Kreisgrabenanlagen ("circular ditched enclosures") in German, or alternatively as roundels (or "rondels"; German Rondelle; sometimes also "rondeloid", since many are not even approximately circular). They are mostly confined to the Elbe and Danube basins, in modern-day Germany, Austria, Czech Republic, Slovakia, as well as the adjacent parts of Hungary and Poland, in a stretch of Central European land some 800 km (500 mi) across. They date to the first half of the 5th millennium BC; they are associated with the late Linear Pottery culture and its local successors, the Stroke-ornamented ware (Middle Danubian) and Lengyel (Moravian Painted Ware) cultures. The best known and oldest of these Circular Enclosures is the Goseck circle, constructed c. 4900 BC.

Only a few examples approximate a circular form; the majority are only very approximately circular or elliptic. One example at Meisternthal is an exact ellipse with identifiable focal points. The distribution of these structures seems to suggest a spread from the middle Danube (southern Slovakia and western Hungary) towards the west (Lower Austria, Lower Bavaria) along the Danube and to the northwest (Moravia, Bohemia, Saxony-Anhalt) following the Elbe. They precede the comparable circular earthwork or timber enclosures known from Great Britain and Ireland, constructed much later during c. 3000 to 1000 BC (late Neolithic to Bronze Age). But, by contrast to the long lifetime of the "Megalithic" culture, the time window during which the Neolithic Roundels were in use is surprisingly narrow, lasting only for about 200–300 years (roughly 49th to 47th centuries BC).

The earliest roundel to be described was the one at Krpy (Kropáčova Vrutice), Bohemia, by Woldřich 1886, but it was only with systematic aerial survey in the 1980s and the 1990s that their ubiquity in the region became apparent. Three types have been distinguished:

- two semicircular ditches forming a circle and separated by causeways at opposing entrances.
- multiple circuits of ditches interrupted with entrances at cardinal or astronomically oriented points and also having an internal single or double timber palisade.
- a single ring ditch.

The structures are mostly interpreted as having served a cultic purpose. Most of them are aligned and seem to have served the function of a calendar (Kalenderbau), in the context of archaeoastronomy sometimes dubbed "observatory", with openings aligned with the points sunrise and/or sunset at the solstices. This is the case with the "gates" or openings of the roundels of Quenstedt, Goseck and Quedlinburg. The observational determination of the time of solstice would not have served a practical (agricultural) purpose, but could have been used to maintain a lunisolar calendar (i.e. knowledge of the date of solstice allows an accurate handling of intercalary months).

Known Circular Enclosures:

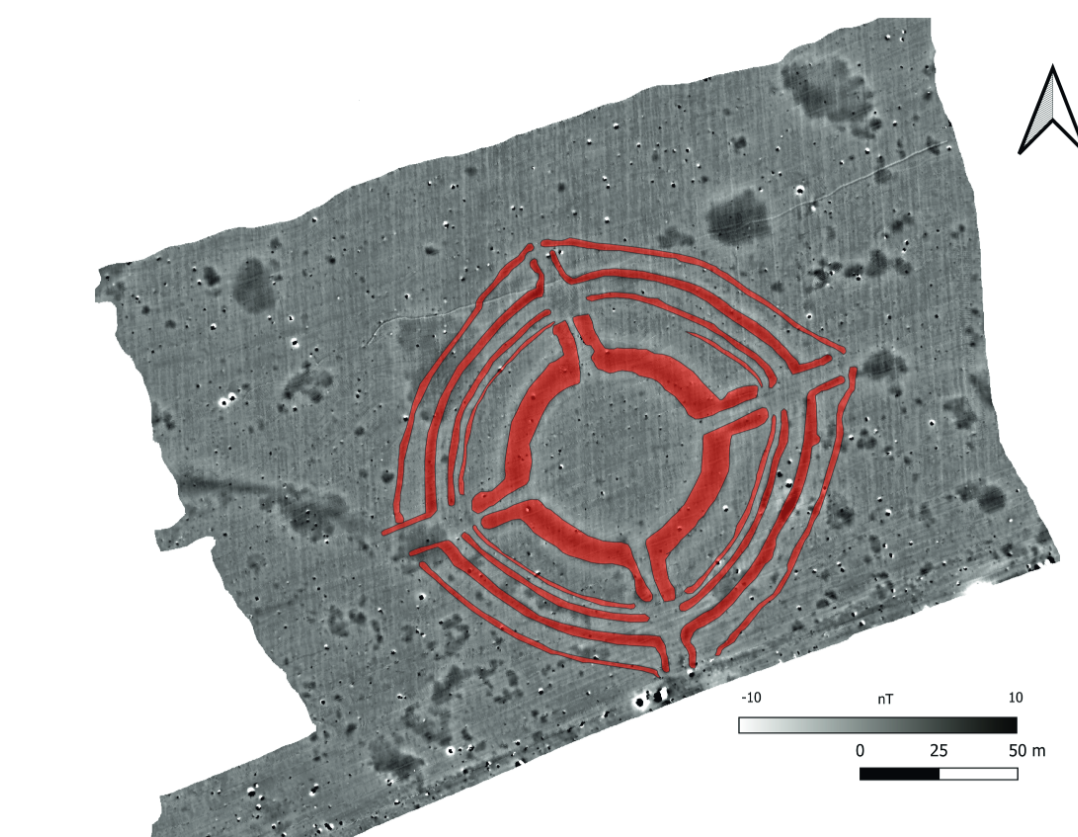
- The Lengyel-period rondell of Podhájska, Slovakia, was found in 2022.
  in Slovakia (Ivan Kuzma 2004): about 50 candidate sites from aerial surveys, not all of which are expected to date to the Neolithic. There are 15 known neolithic (Lengyel) sites (confirmed in 2024). The largest of these are (with outer diameters of more than 100 m): Svodín 2 (140 m), Demandice (120 m), Bajtava (175 m), Podhájska (158 m), Horné Otrokovce (150 m), Podhorany-Mechenice (120 m), Cífer (127 m), Golianovo (210 m), Žitavce (145 m), Hosťovce (250–300 m), Prašník (175 m). Others include: Borovce, Bučany, Golianovo, Kľačany, Milanovce, Nitrianský Hrádok, Ružindol-Borová.
- in Hungary: Aszód, Polgár-Csőszhalom, Sé, Vokány, Szemely-Hegyes.
- in the Czech Republic (Jaroslav Ridky 2004): 15 known sites, all dated to the late Stroked pottery (Stk IVA). Běhařovice, Borkovany, Bulhary, Krpy, Křepice, Mašovice, Němčičky, Rašovice, Těšetice, Vedrovice, Vinoř roundel near Prague
- in Austria (Doneus et al. 2004): 47 known sites with diameters between 40 and 180 m. Lower Austria: Asparn an der Zaya, Altruppersdorf, Altruppersdorf, Au am Leithagebirge, Friebritz (2 sites), Gauderndorf, Glaubendorf (2 sites), Gnadendorf, Göllersdorf, Herzogbirbaum, Hornsburg, Immendorf, Kamegg, Karnabrunn, Kleedorf, Kleinrötz, Michelstetten, Moosbierbaum, Mühlbach am Manhartsberg, Oberthern, Perchtoldsdorf, Plank am Kamp, Porrau, Pottenbrunn, Pranhartsberg, Puch, Rosenburg, Schletz, Simonsfeld, Statzendorf, Steinabrunn, Stiefern, Straß im Straßertale, Strögen, Velm, Wetzleinsdorf, Wilhelmsdorf, Winden, Würnitz. Upper Austria: Ölkam.
- in Poland by region:
  - Biskupin (Greater Poland)
  - Bodzów, Rąpice
  - Pietrowice Wielkie (Upper Silesia)
  - Nowe Objezierze (Pomerania)
  - near Łysomice (Kuyavian-Pomeranian)
  - near Tylice (Kuyavian-Pomeranian)
  - Drzemlikowice (Lower Silesia)
- in Germany

There are around 50, among them:

  - Saxony Anhalt (Ralf Schwarz 2004): Quenstedt, Goseck, Kötschlitz, Quedlinburg, outer diameters between 72 and 110 m.
  - Saxony: Dresden-Nickern (3 sites), Eythra (2 sites), Neukyhna (3 sites)
  - Bavaria: Lower Bavaria: Eching-Viecht, Künzing-Unternberg, Meisternthal, Moosburg an der Isar-Kirchamper, Oberpöring-Gneiding, Osterhofen-Schmiedorf (2 sites), Stephansposching Wallerfing-Ramsdorf, Zeholfing-Kothingeichendorf; Upper Bavaria: Penzberg
  - Nordrhein-Westfalen: Borchum-Harpen, Warburg-Daseburg
  - Niedersachsen: Müsleringen
  - Franconia: Hopferstadt, Ippesheim
  - Brandenburg: Bochow, Quappendorf
  - Rheinland-Pfalz: Goloring

== See also ==
- Goseck circle
- Schalkenburg
- Astronomical complex
- Earthwork (archaeology)
- Henge
- Stroke-ornamented ware culture
- Lengyel culture

== Other sources ==
- Neolithic Circular Enclosures in Europe, International Workshop in Goseck (Saxony-Anhalt, Germany) 7.-9. Mai 2004 (abstracts).
- Gillian Varndell, Peter Topping (eds.), Enclosures in Neolithic Europe, Oxbow, 2002, ISBN 9781842170687.
- Peter F. Biel, "Measuring time in the European Neolithic? The function and meaning of Central European circular enclosures" in: Iain Morley, Colin Renfrew (eds.), The Archaeology of Measurement: Comprehending Heaven, Earth and Time in Ancient Societies, Cambridge University Press, 2010, ISBN 9780521119900, 229-243.
- Thomas Plath, Zur Problematik der Nutzungsinterpretation mittelneolithischer Kreisgrabenanlagen, diss. Hamburg University, 2011.
- Falko Daim, Wolfgang Neubauer, Zeitreise Heldenberg – Geheimnisvolle Kreisgräben. Horn, Wien : Berger, 2005 (Katalog des Niederösterreichischen Landesmuseums, N. F. 459).
- André Spatzier, Systematische Untersuchungen der Kreisgrabenanlage von Pömmelte-Zackmünde, Salzlandkreis. Zum Abschluss der Grabungen an mitteldeutschen Rondellen im Rahmen der Forschergruppe FOR:550. In: H. Meller (Hrsg.), Zusammengegraben - Kooperationsprojekte in Sachsen-Anhalt. Tagung vom 17. bis 20. Mai 2009 im Landesmuseum für Vorgeschichte Halle (Saale). Arch. Sachsen-Anhalt Sonderbd. 13 (Halle/Saale 2012), 89–98.
