= Stroke-ornamented ware culture =

Archaeological horizon of Central Europe (4900–4400 BC)

Stroke Ornamented Pottery culture
- Geographical range: Central Europe
- Period: Neolithic Europe
- Dates: c. 4900 BC — c. 4400 BC
- Major sites: Goseck, Nickern
- Preceded by: Linear Pottery culture
- Followed by: Michelsberg culture, Funnelbeaker culture, Globular Amphora culture

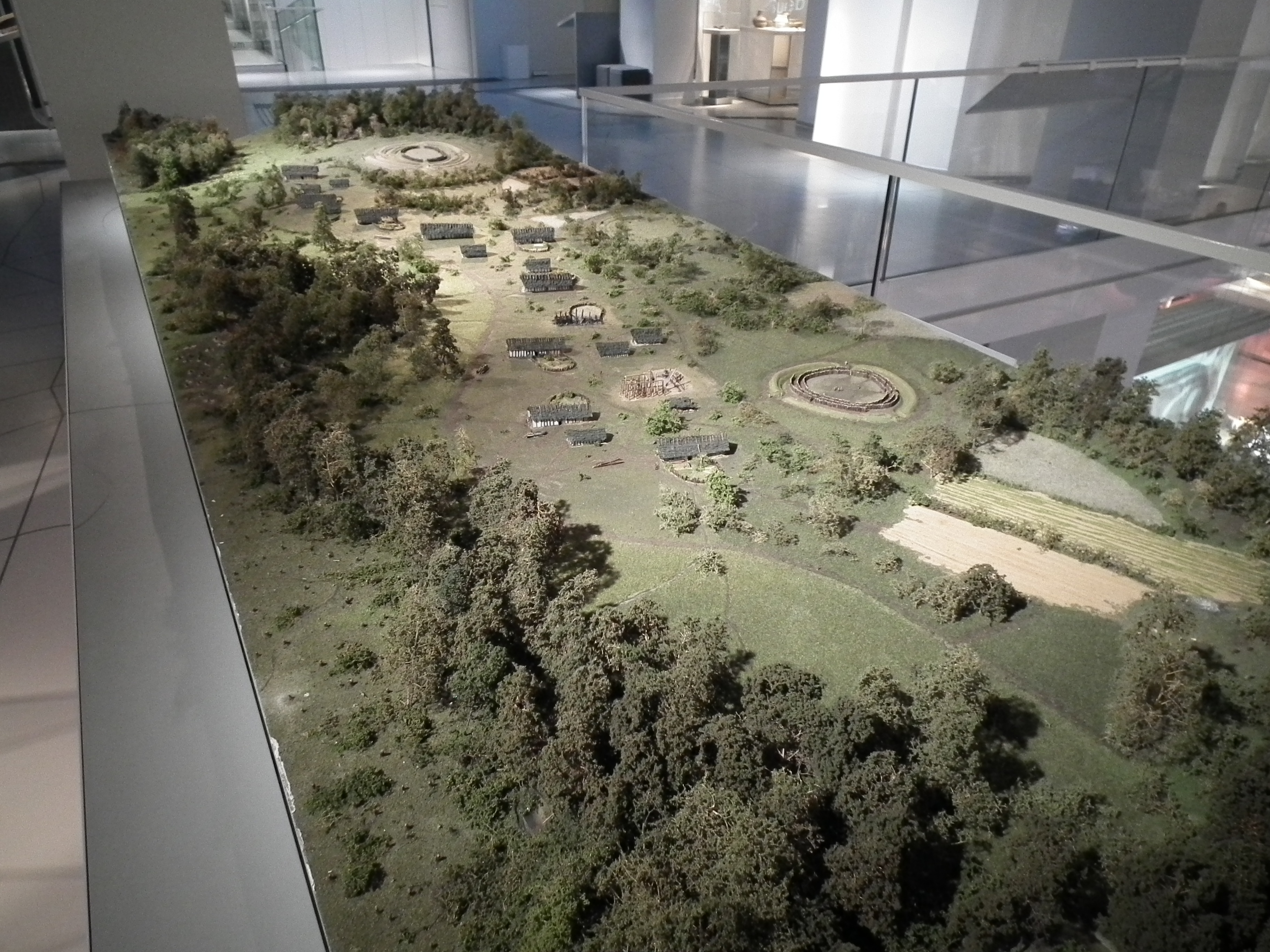
Model of the STK settlement at Dresden-Nickern, showing longhouses and circular enclosures

The Stroke-ornamented ware (culture) or (German) Stichbandkeramik (abbr. STK or STbK), Stroked Pottery culture, Danubian Ib culture of V. Gordon Childe, or Middle Danubian culture is the successor of the Linear Pottery culture, a major archaeological horizon of the European Neolithic in Central Europe. The STK flourishes during approximately 4900-4400 BC. Centered on Silesia in Poland, eastern Germany, and the northern Czech Republic, it overlaps with the Lengyel horizon to the south and the Rössen culture to the west.

== Description ==
The STbK and the Notenkopfkeramik (Musical Note pottery) are a development of the LBK. Much it features incised zig-zag bands going around the pot, with punctures at the line segment junctions. The STK abandons incision in favor bands of small punctures, also in zig-zag patterns, with a vertical band dividing each angle. The effect is a band pattern of contiguous A-frames.

Where the Musical Note pottery expanded east over the Bug River, the STK moved down the Vistula and Elbe. The spread of this style must have been basically the transmission of cultural objects. The homes of the STK people show a slight modification that became a major feature of later cultures: one end of the long house was made shorter than the other to achieve a trapezoidal shape. The reason for this modification remains obscure. Also, the STK people developed a preference for cremation rather than burial. The preceding early LBK had used both methods.

== Goseck circle ==
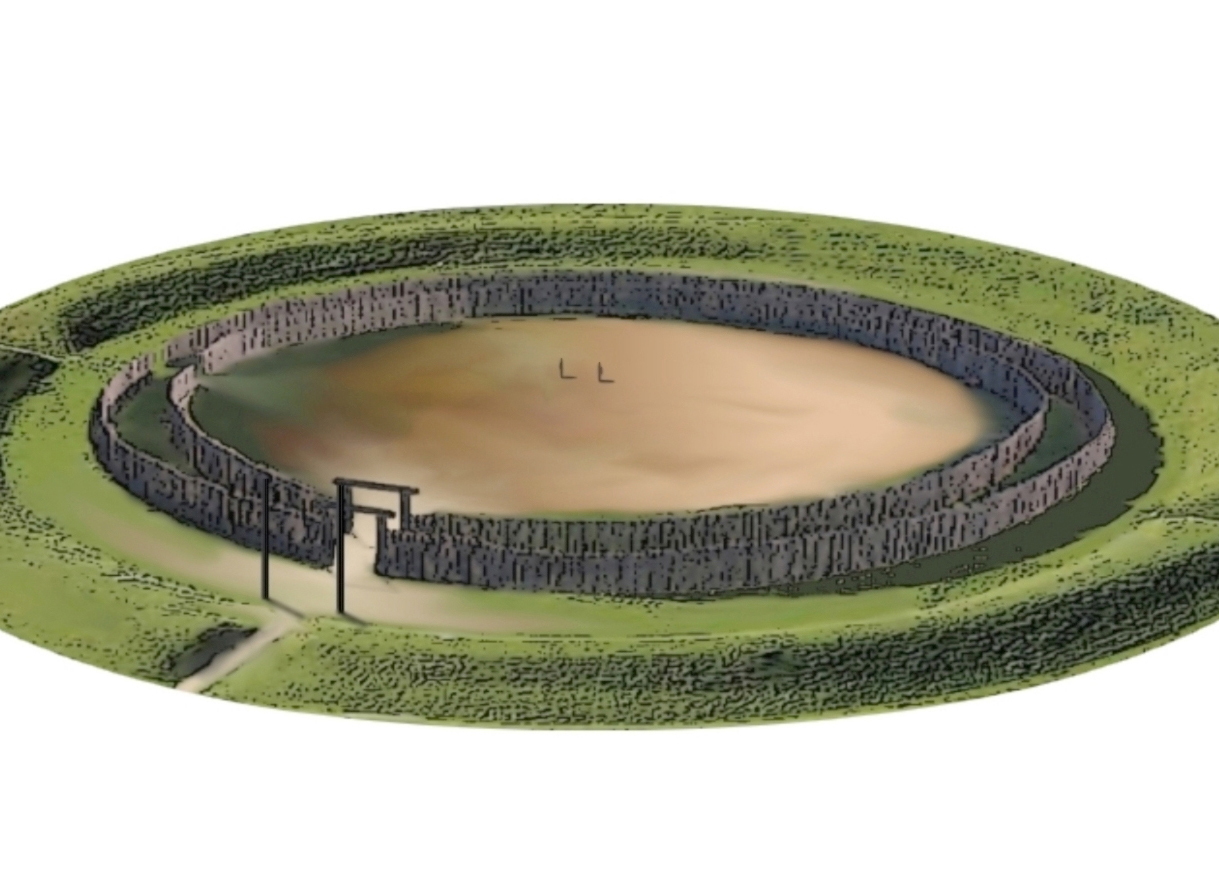
Goseck Circle, c. 4900 BC

An unusual structure associated with STK has been found at Goseck, southwest of Berlin in Saxony-Anhalt : a large, double concentric ring of post holes pierced by gates and surrounded by a circular ditch. The placement of the gates and some of the posts lead some investigators to hypothesize an observatory similar to Stonehenge, but in wood rather than stone; i.e., the posts mark some positions of celestial bodies.

== Gallery ==
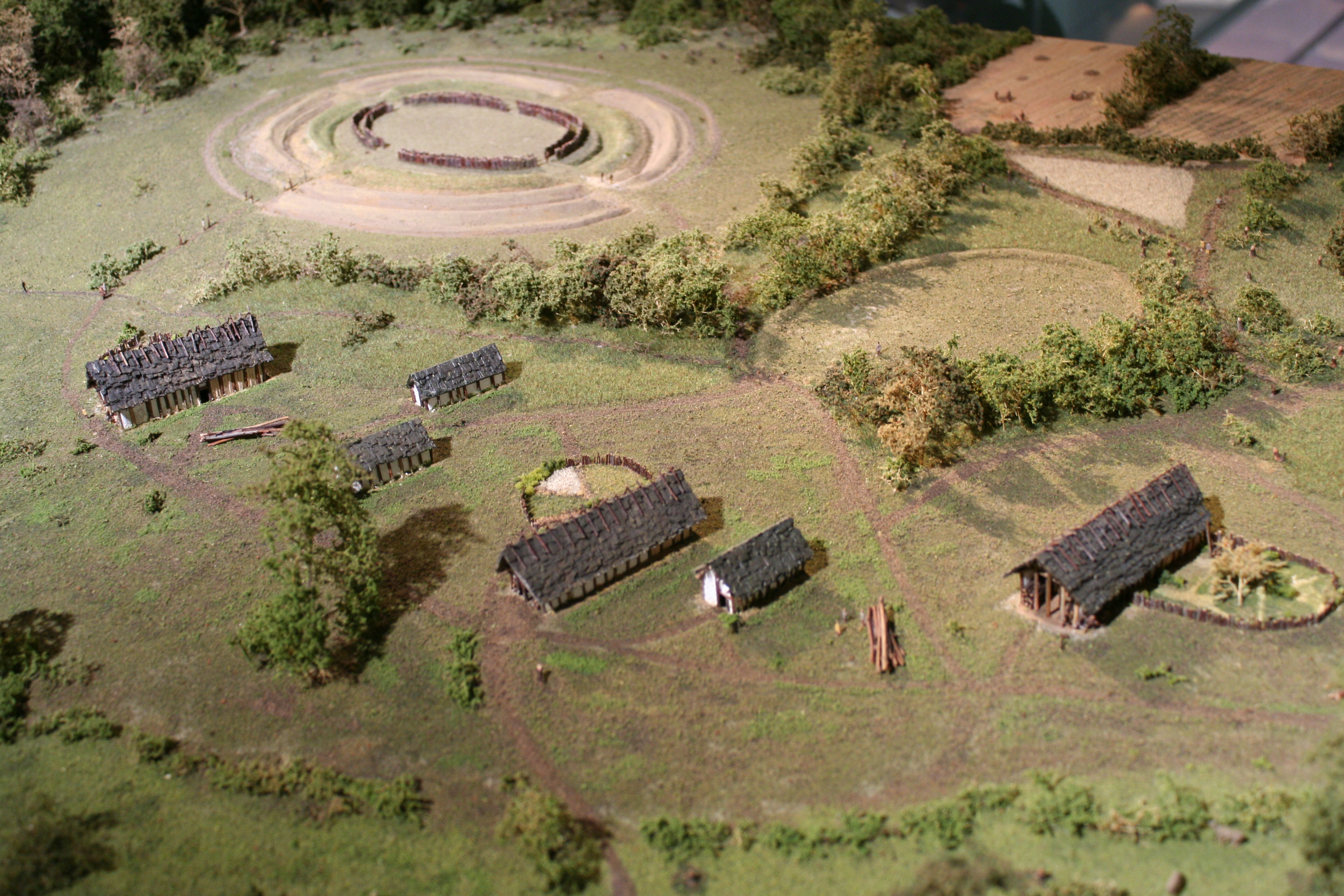
The Dresden-Nickern settlement

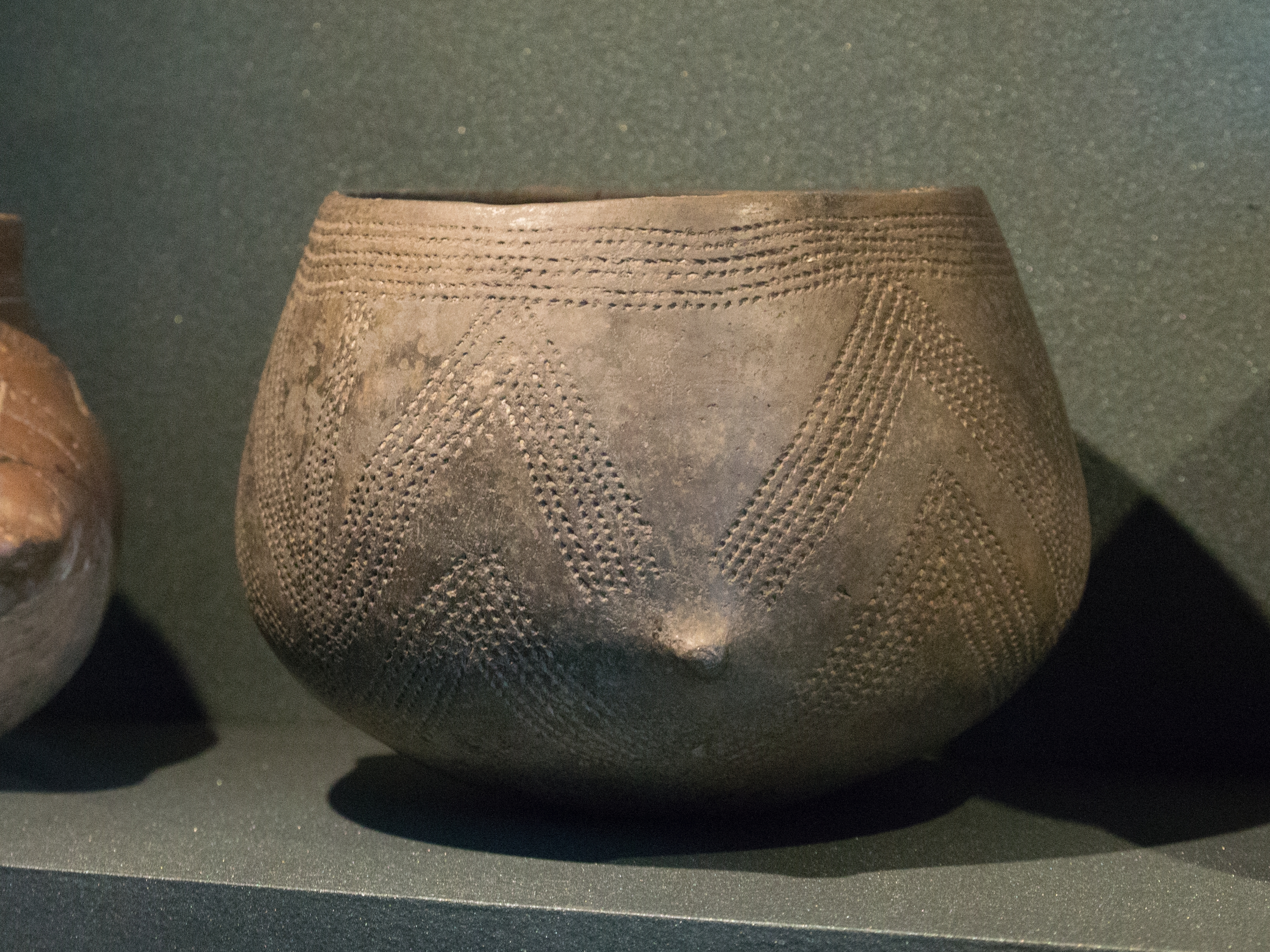
Stroke-ornamented Ware, City of Prague Museum

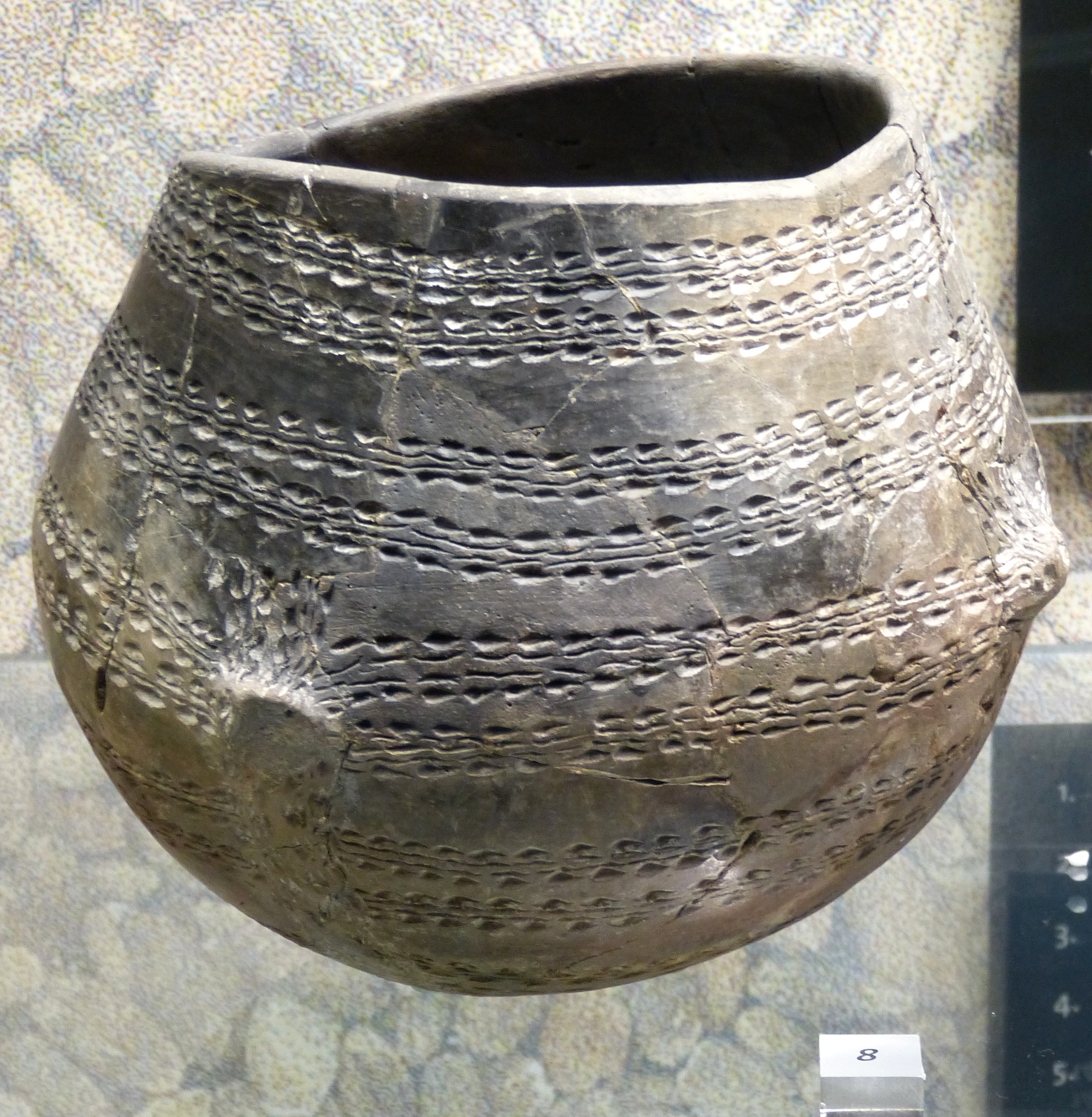
Museum for Prehistory, Thuringia

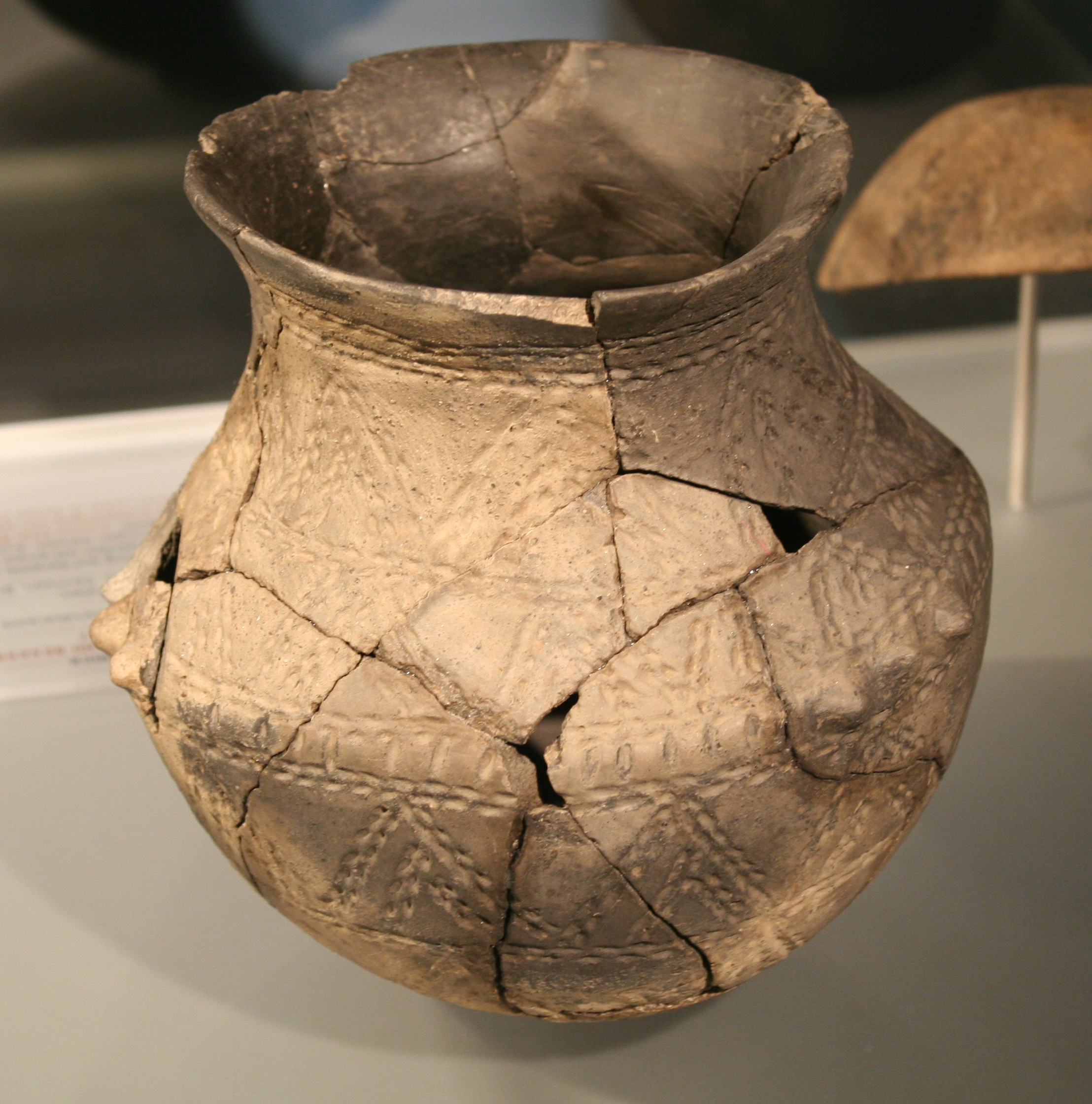
State Museum of Archaeology, Chemnitz

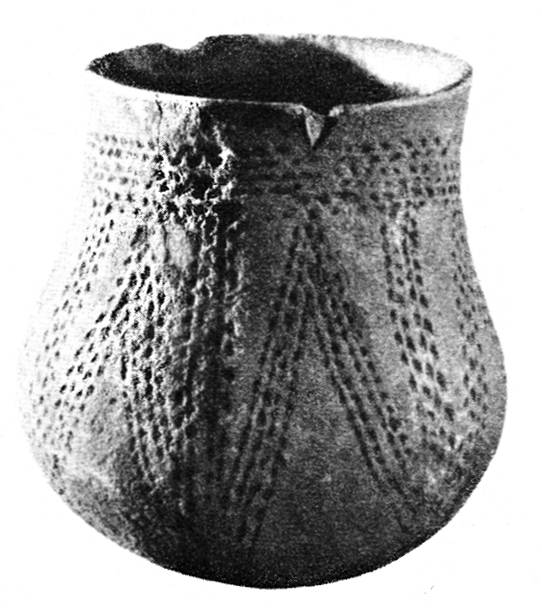
State Museum of Prehistory, Berlin

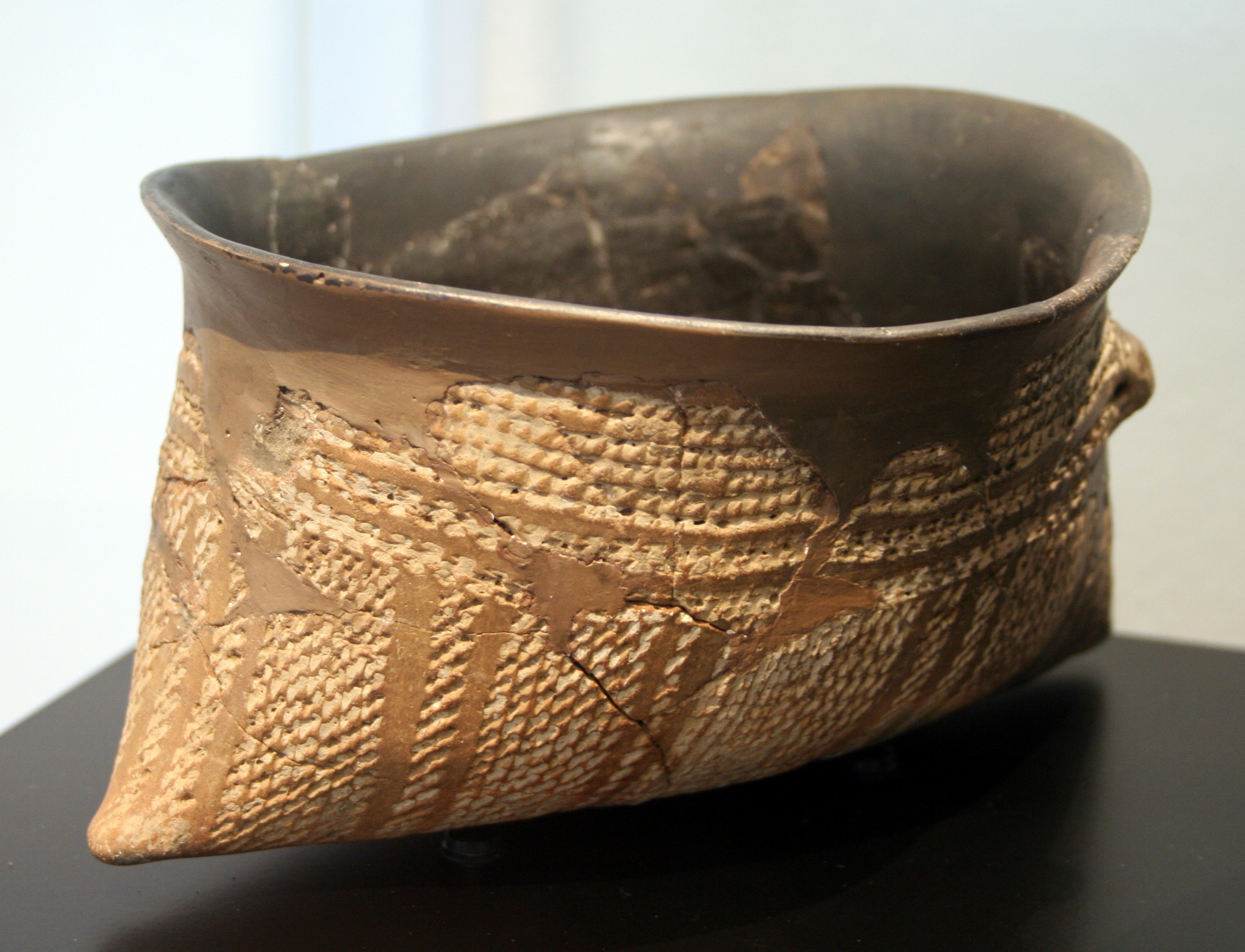
State Museum of Württemberg, Stuttgart

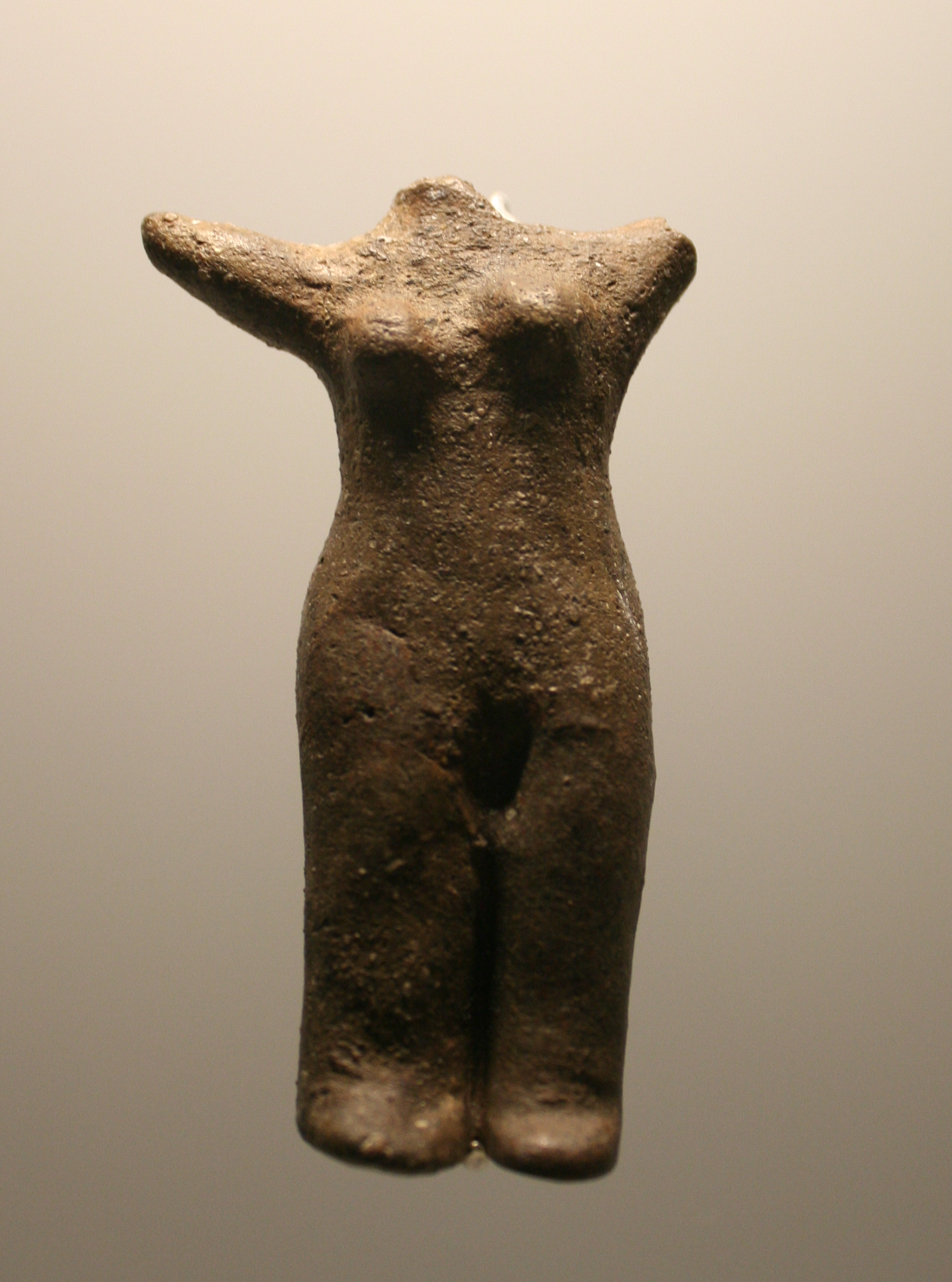
Ceramic figurine

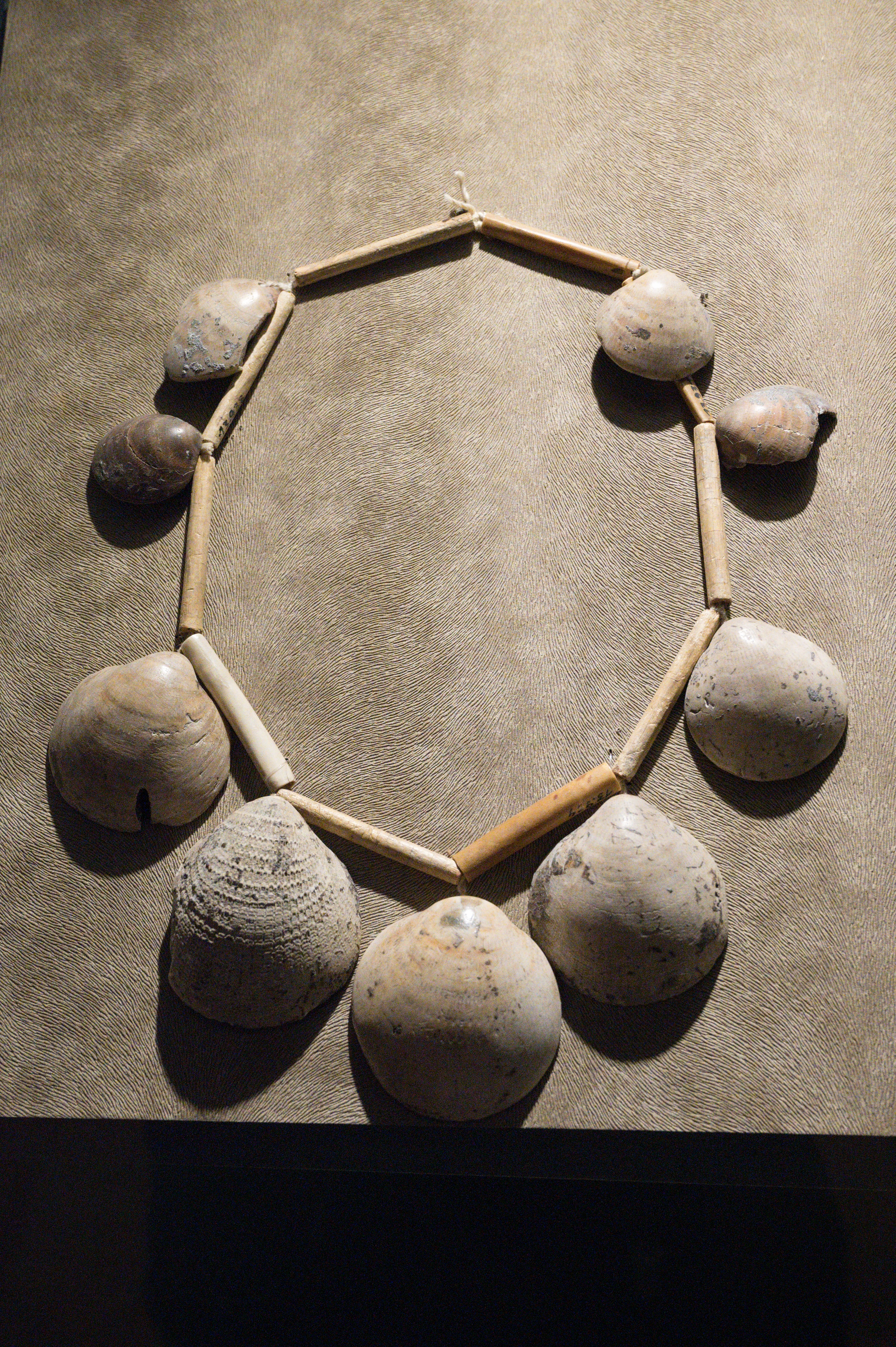
Shell necklace

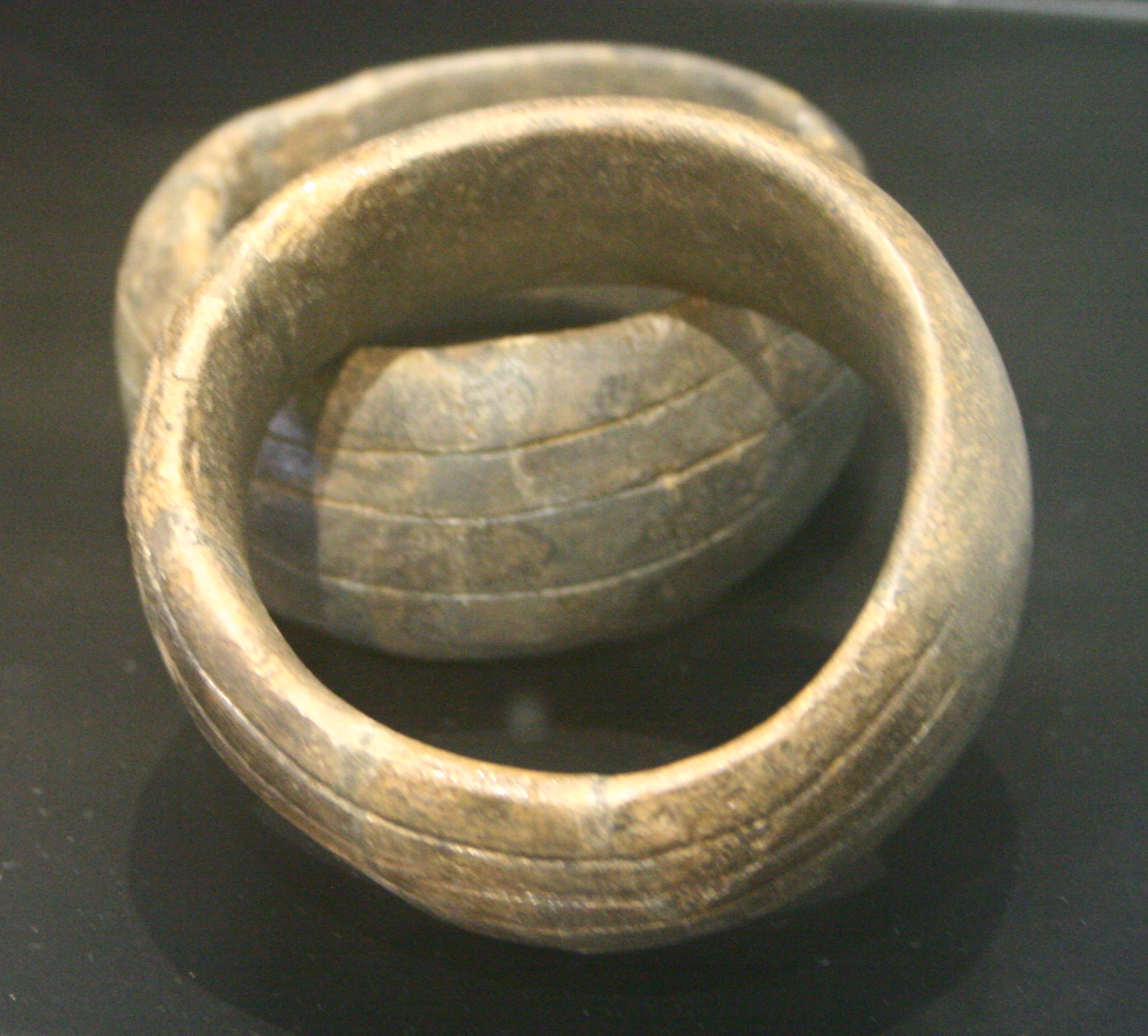
Bracelets
