= Bylany (Chrudim District) =

- Municipality
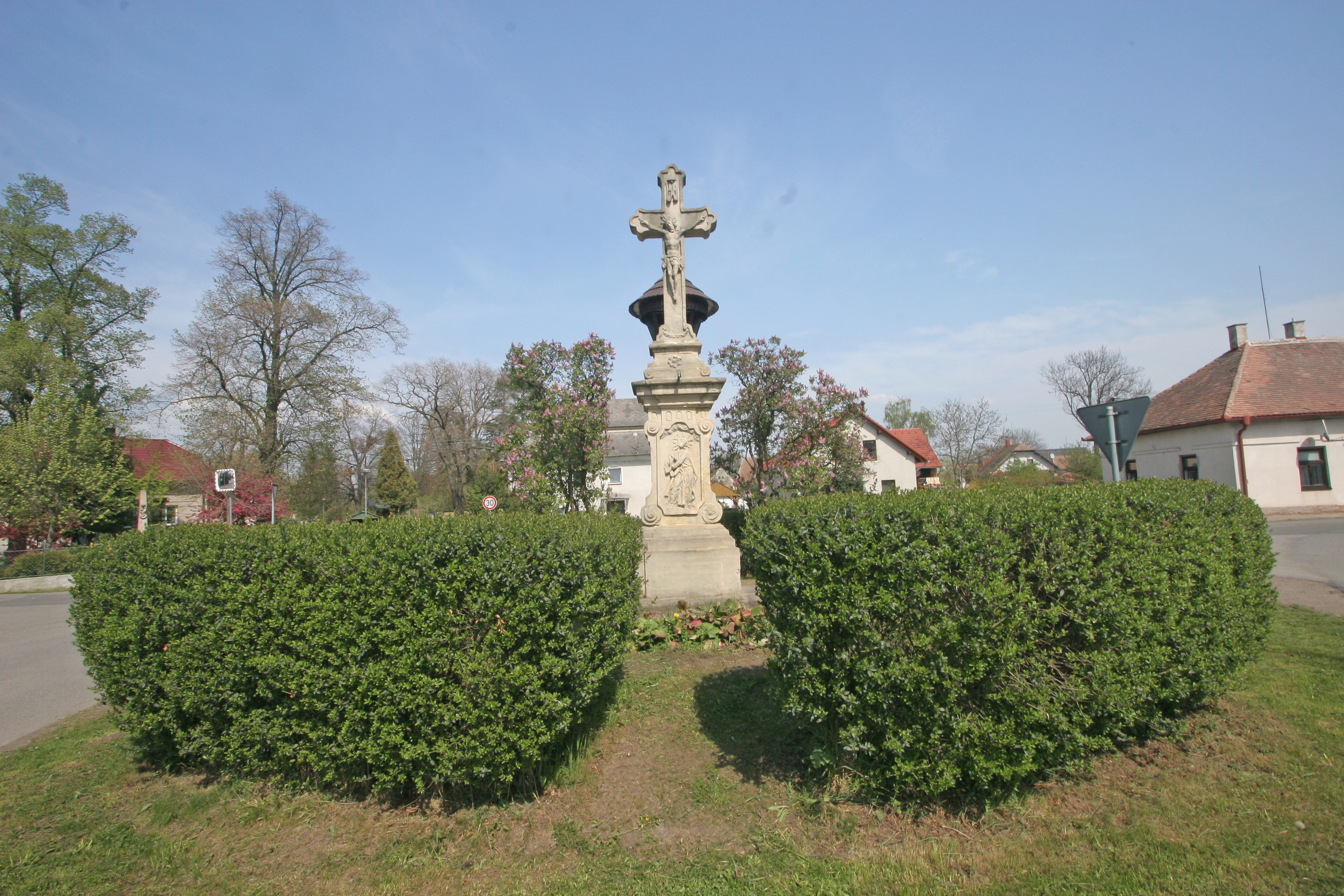
- Centre of Bylany

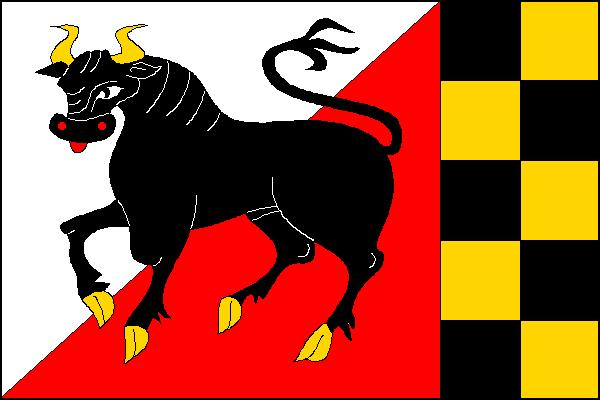
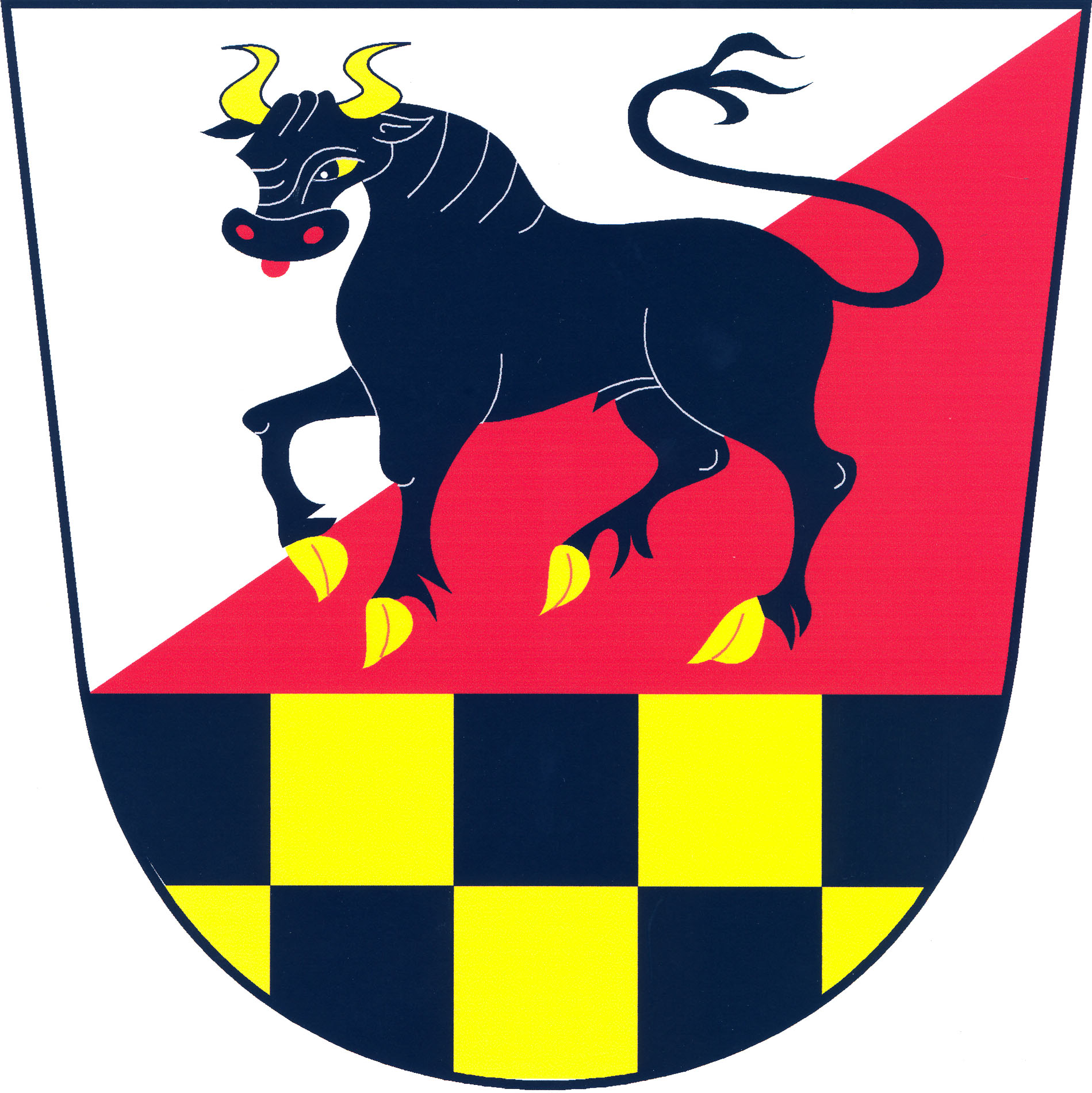
- Flag Coat of arms

- Location in the Czech Republic
- Coordinates: 49°57′26″N 15°44′0″E
- Country: Czech Republic
- Region: Pardubice
- District: Chrudim
- First mentioned: 1271

Area
  - Total: 3.68 km^{2} (1.42 sq mi)
- Elevation: 252 m (827 ft)

Population (2026-01-01)
  - Total: 485
  - Density: 132/km^{2} (341/sq mi)
- Time zone: UTC+1 (CET)
  - Summer (DST): UTC+2 (CEST)
- Postal code: 538 01
- Website: www.bylany.cz

Bylany is a municipality and village in Chrudim District in the Pardubice Region of the Czech Republic. It has about 500 inhabitants.

== Demographics ==
Historical population
Year	Pop.	±%
1869	331	—
1880	335	+1.2%
1890	486	+45.1%
1900	526	+8.2%
1910	575	+9.3%
1921	530	−7.8%
1930	481	−9.2%
1950	352	−26.8%
1961	333	−5.4%
1970	303	−9.0%
1980	347	+14.5%
1991	351	+1.2%
2001	328	−6.6%
2011	410	+25.0%
2021	444	+8.3%
Source: Censuses
