= Lengyel culture =

Central European archaeological culture (c. 5000–4000 BC)

- Horizon: Old Europe
- Geographical range: Central Europe
- Period: Neolithic, Chalcolithic
- Dates: c. 5000 BC — c. 4000 BC
- Major sites: Lengyel
- Preceded by: Linear Pottery culture, Tisza culture
- Followed by: Funnelbeaker culture, Baden culture, Globular Amphora culture

The Lengyel culture is an archaeological culture of the European Neolithic, centered on the Middle Danube in Central Europe. It flourished from 5000 to 4000 BC, ending with phase IV, e.g., in Bohemia represented by the 'Jordanow/Jordansmühler culture'. It is followed by the Funnelbeaker culture/TrB culture and the Baden culture. The eponymous type site is at Lengyel in Tolna county, Hungary.

== Description ==
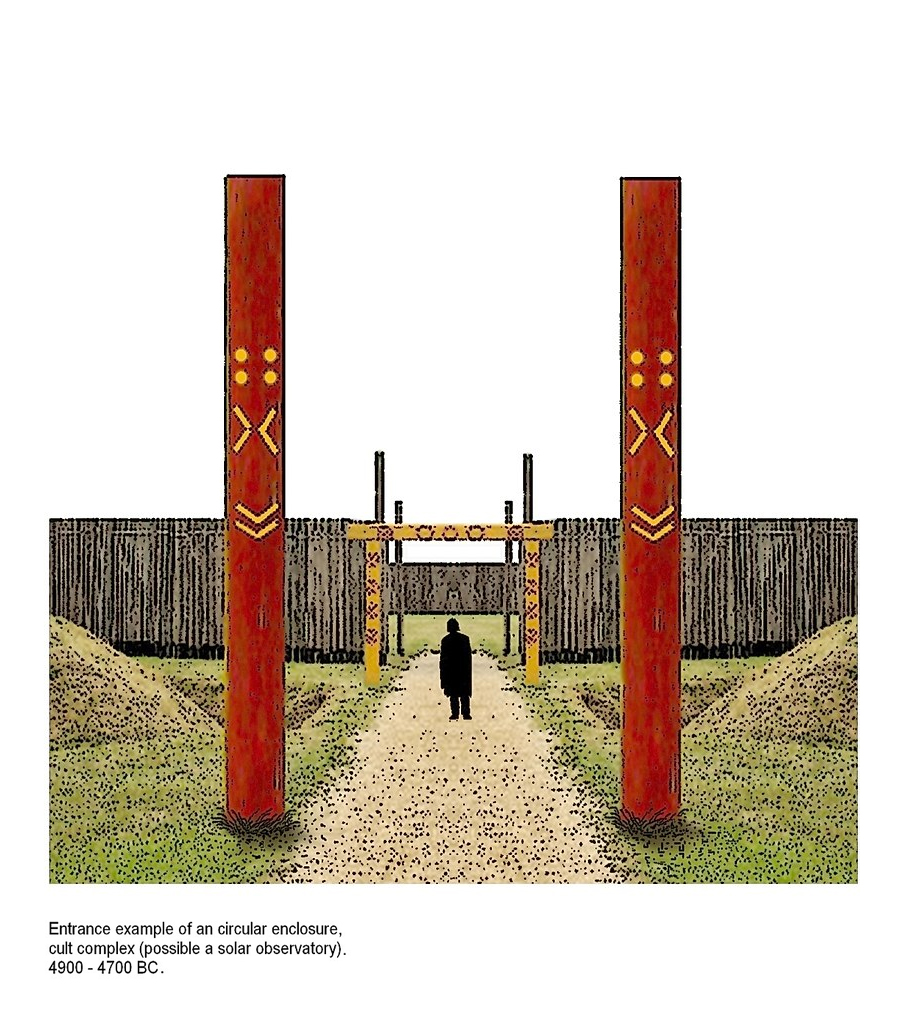
Neolithic enclosure, reconstruction

The Lengyel culture was preceded by the Linear Pottery culture and succeeded by the Corded Ware culture. In its northern extent, overlapped the somewhat later but otherwise approximately contemporaneous Funnelbeaker culture. Also closely related are the Stroke-ornamented ware and Rössen cultures, adjacent to the north and west, respectively.

Subgroups of the Lengyel horizon include the Austrian/Moravian Painted Ware I and II, Aichbühl, Jordanów/Jordanov/Jordansmühl, Schussenried, Gatersleben, etc.

It is a wide interaction sphere or cultural horizon rather than an archaeological culture in the narrow sense. Its distribution overlaps with the Tisza culture and with Stroke-Ornamented Pottery (STK) as far north as Osłonki, central Poland.

Lengyel pottery was found in western Hungary, the Czech Republic, Slovakia, Austria, Poland, and Slovenia. Several Sopot culture finds in Croatia and Hungary were dated to the same general periods as the Lengyel culture finds. Influence in pottery styles is found even further afield, in parts of Germany and Switzerland.

Agriculture and stock raising (mainly cattle, but also pigs, and to a lesser extent, ovicaprids) was practiced, though many wild faunal remains have also been recovered. Settlements consisted of small houses as well as trapezoid longhouses. These settlements were sometimes open, sometimes surrounded by a defensive ditch.

The Lengyel people also practiced mining. A 2025 archaeological study of a chert mining field in the Krumlov Forest of the Czech Republic, one of the largest in Europe, reported the graves of two adult sisters and an infant within a mine shaft. The women's skeletons bore signs of vertebral degeneration and early arthritis consistent with the heavy labor associated with mining.

Inhumation was in separate cemeteries, in the flexed position with apparently no preference for which side the deceased was laid out in.

Lengyel sites of the later period show signs of the use of copper in form of beads and hammered ribbons, marking the dawn of the Chalcolithic period in Central Europe.

It was associated with the cover-term Old Europe by Marija Gimbutas, though may have been undergone "kurganization" by the Proto-Indo-Europeans and become integrated into the successor Globular Amphora culture.

== Archaeogenetics ==
According to archaeogenetic studies, its population had no or negligible amount of Indo-European steppe ancestry.

Lipson et al. (2017), Narasimshan et al. (2019) and Patterson et al. (2022) detected in nine individuals from Hungary ascribed to the Lengyel culture the Y-Haplogroups H, H-P96, I2a2a-S6635, I2a1a1b-S21825, G2a2a1-PF3148, J2a1a2b-Z6055, C1a2-V86, and E1b1b1a1b1-L618. mtDNA extracted were various subclades of U8b1a2b, N1a1a, T2b, H and H44, J1c, W1. According to ADMIXTURE analysis they had approximately 85-98% Early European Farmers, 4-12% Western Hunter-Gatherer and 0-3% Western Steppe Herders-related ancestry.

== Gallery ==
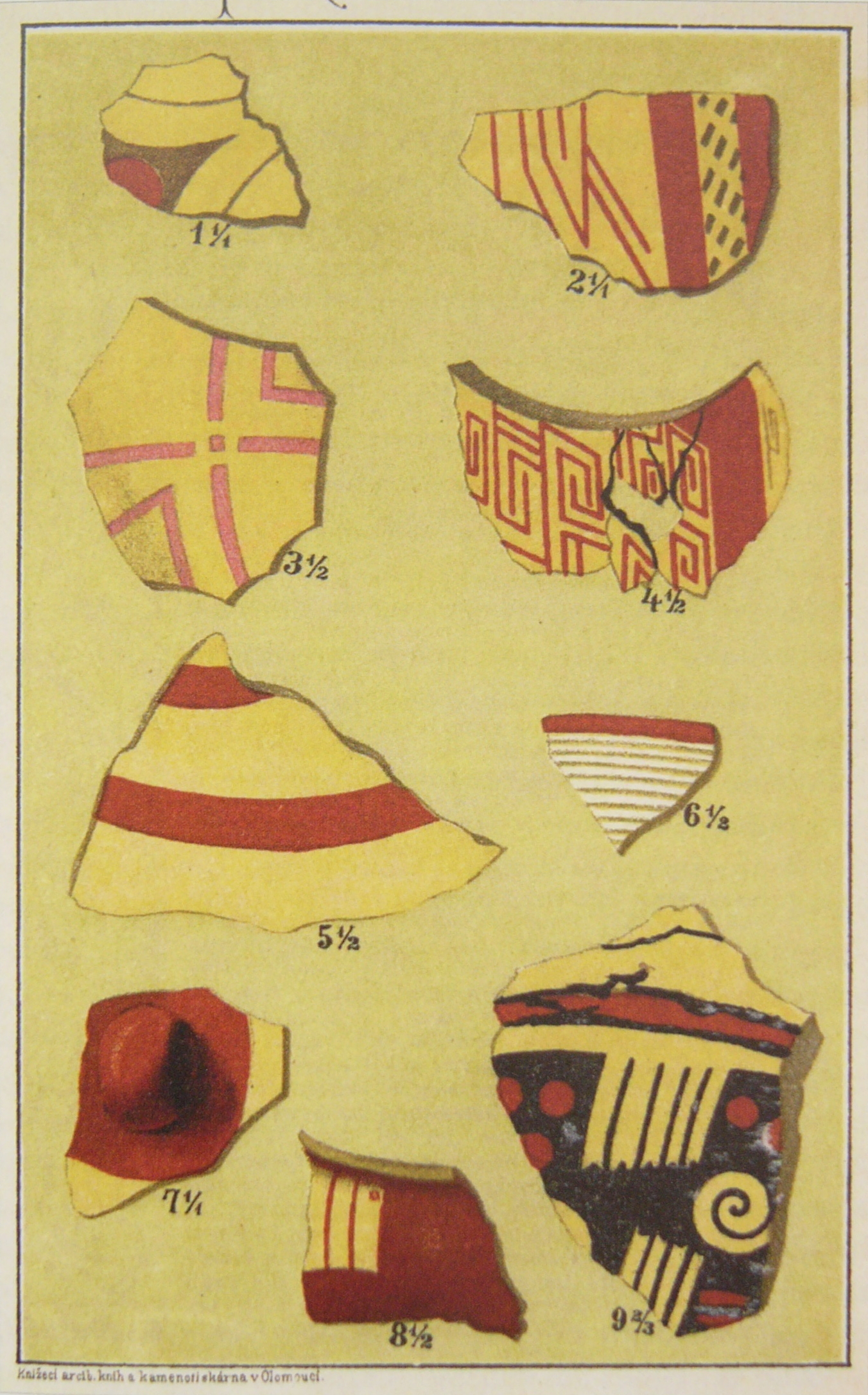
Lengyel painted pottery sherds

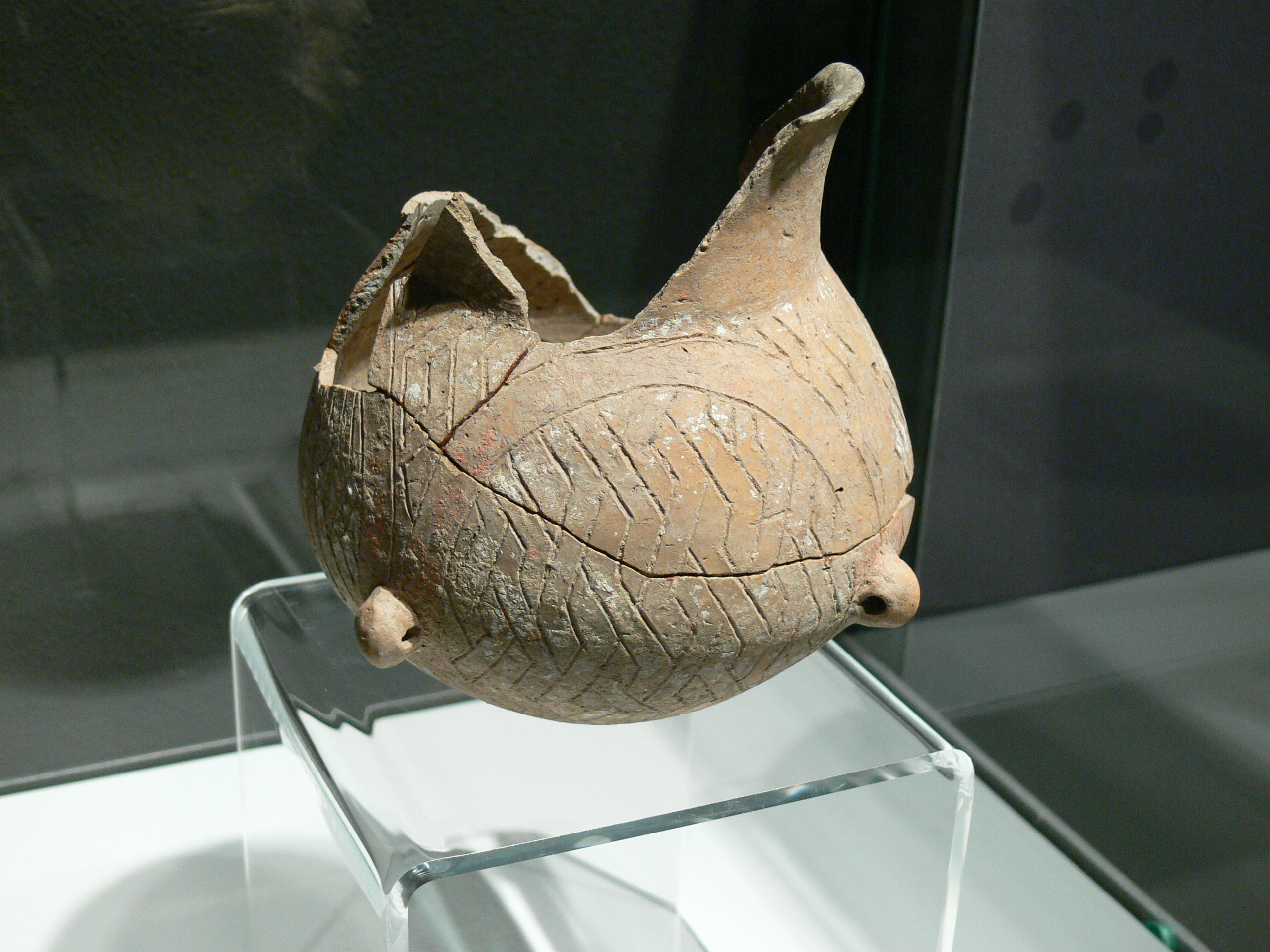
Lengyel pottery.

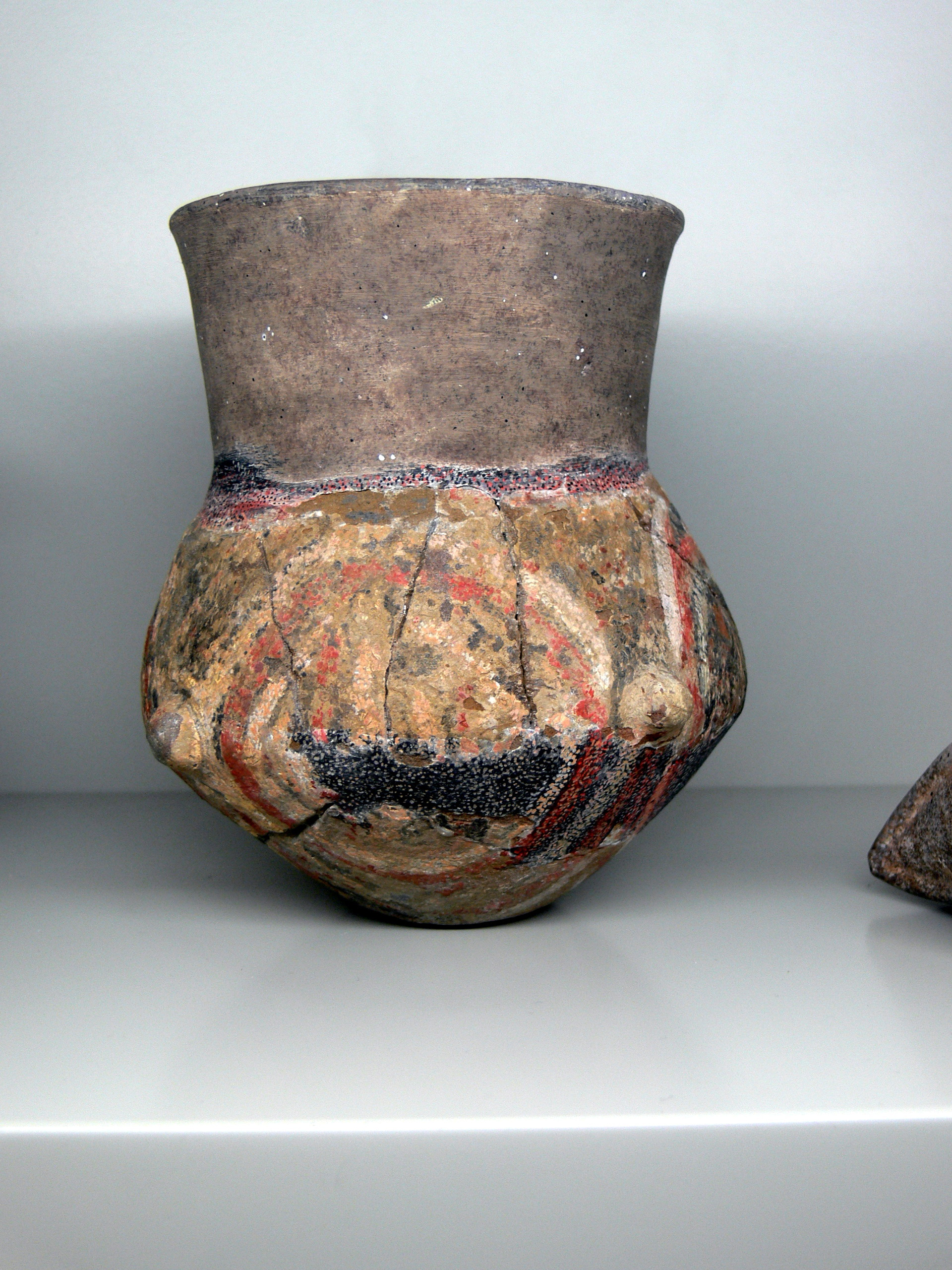
Lengyel pottery

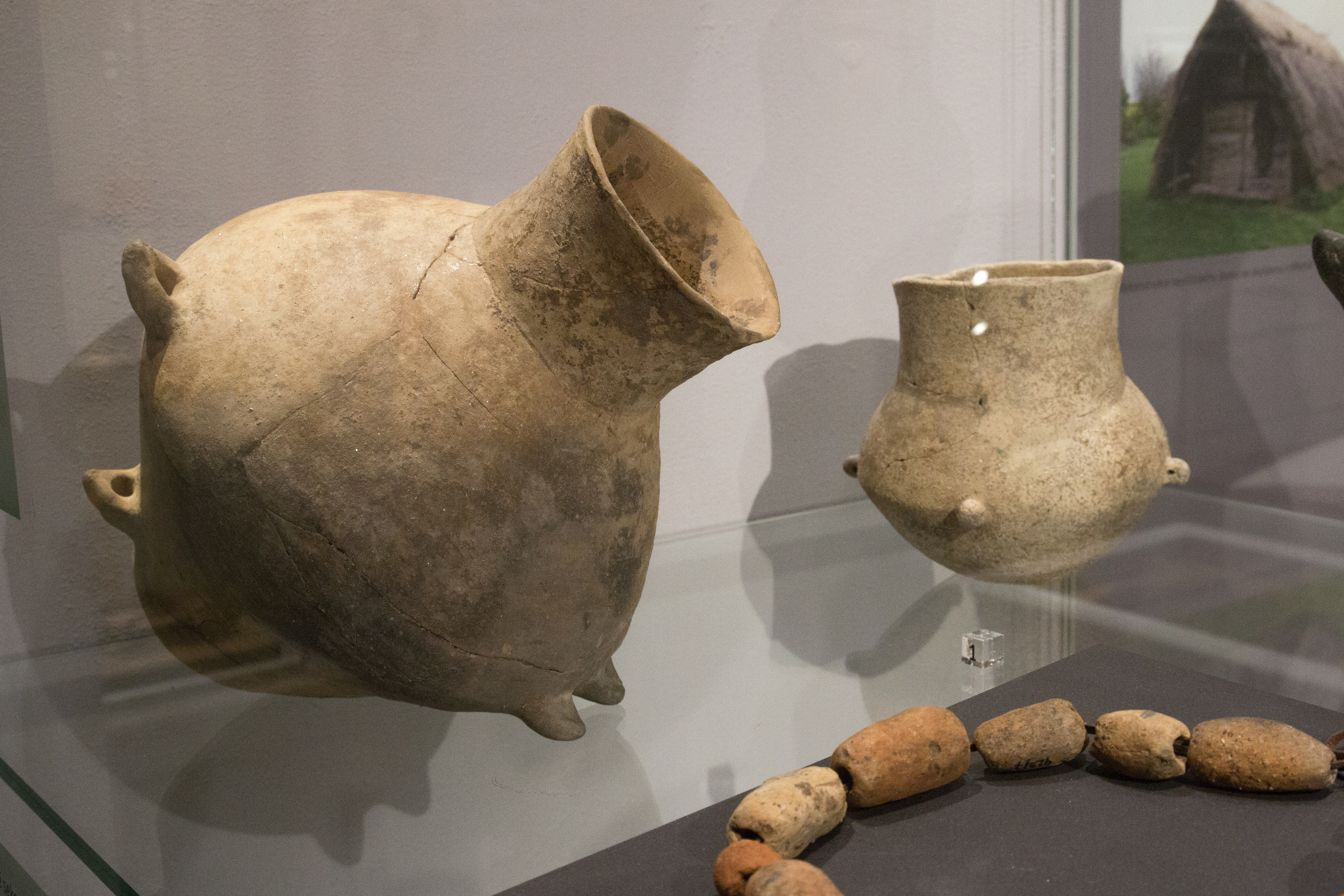
Lengyel pottery

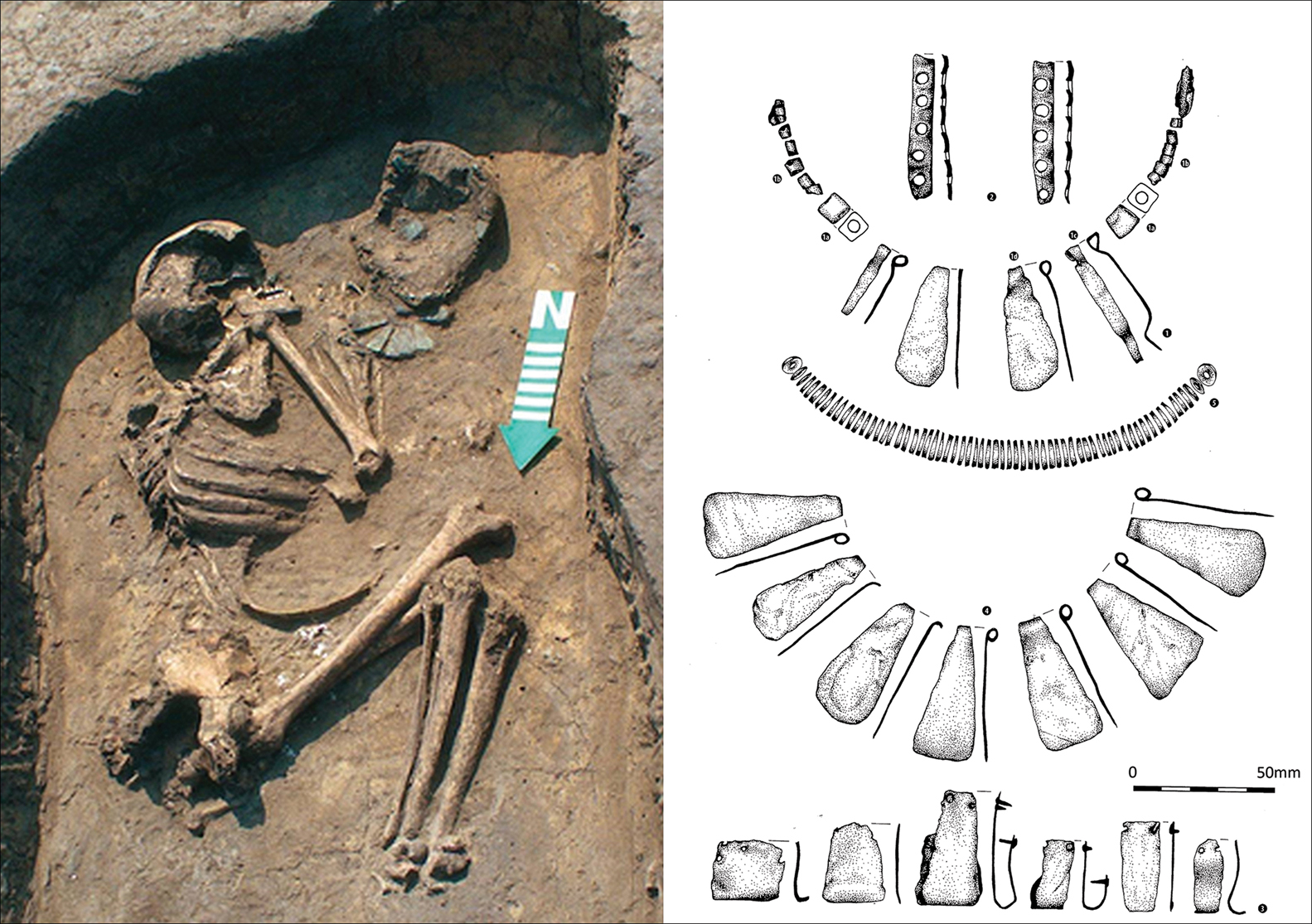
Burial with copper items, Oslonki, Poland, 4100 BC

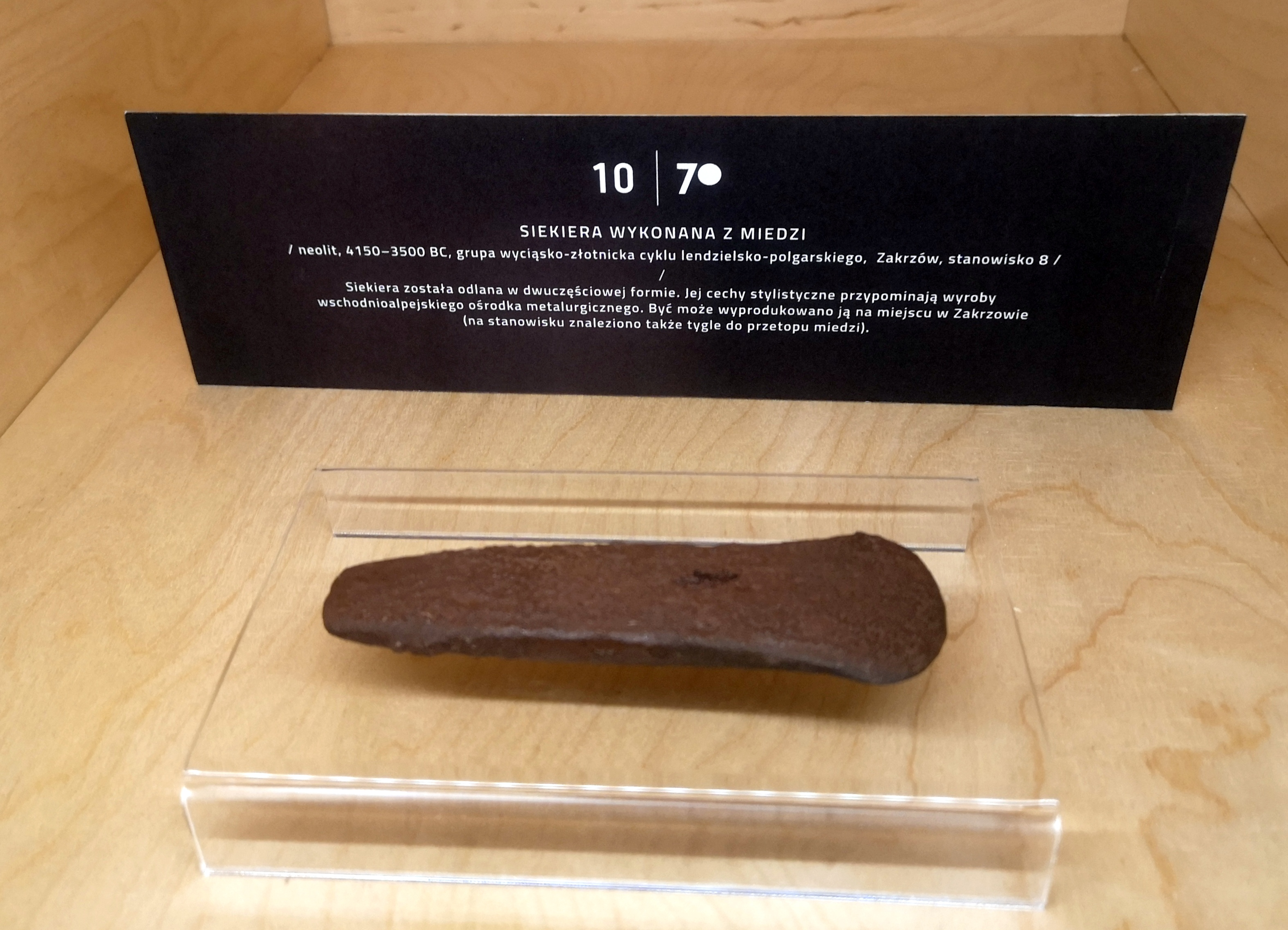
Copper axe, Poland, c. 4000 BC

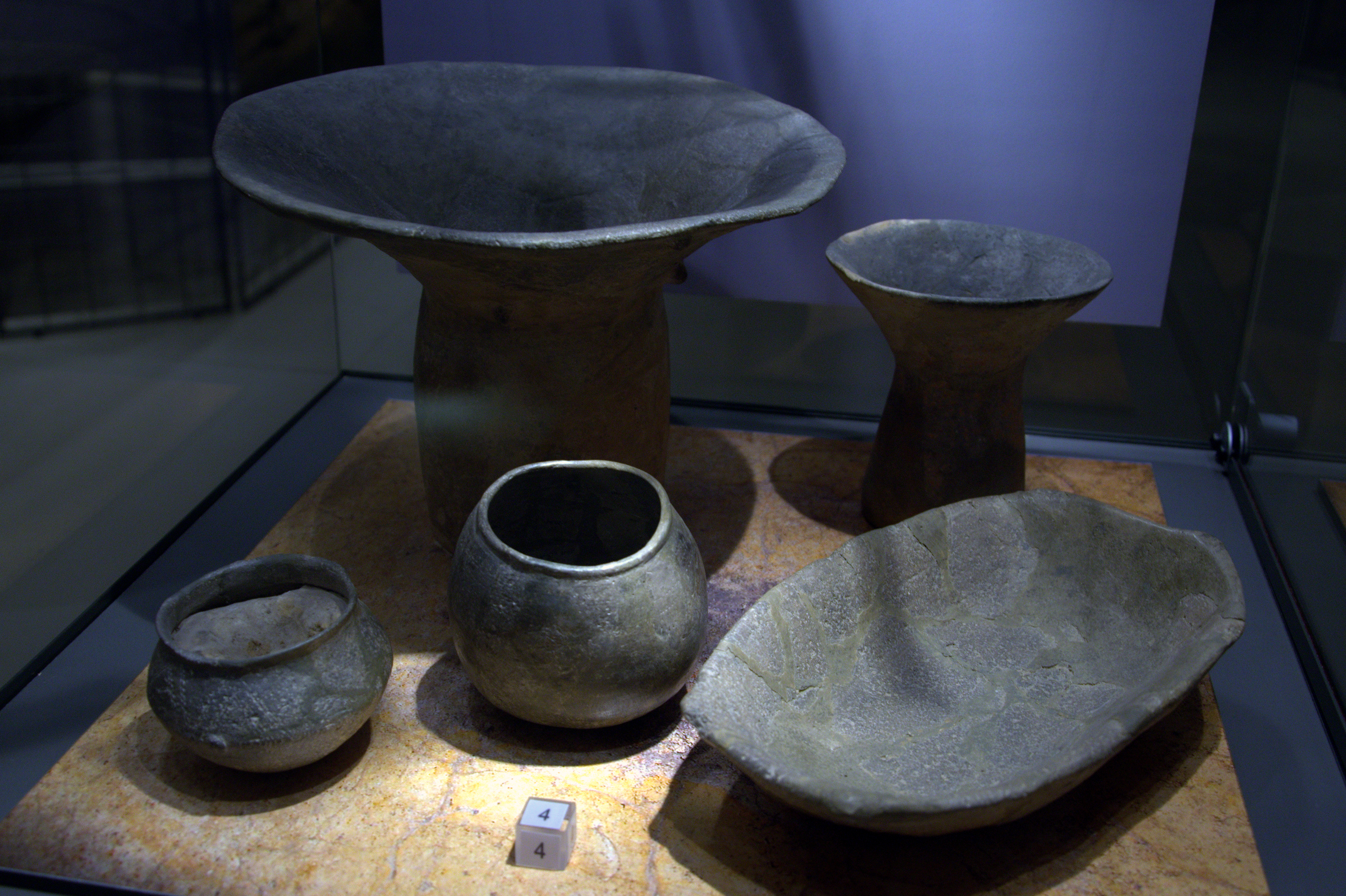
Pottery

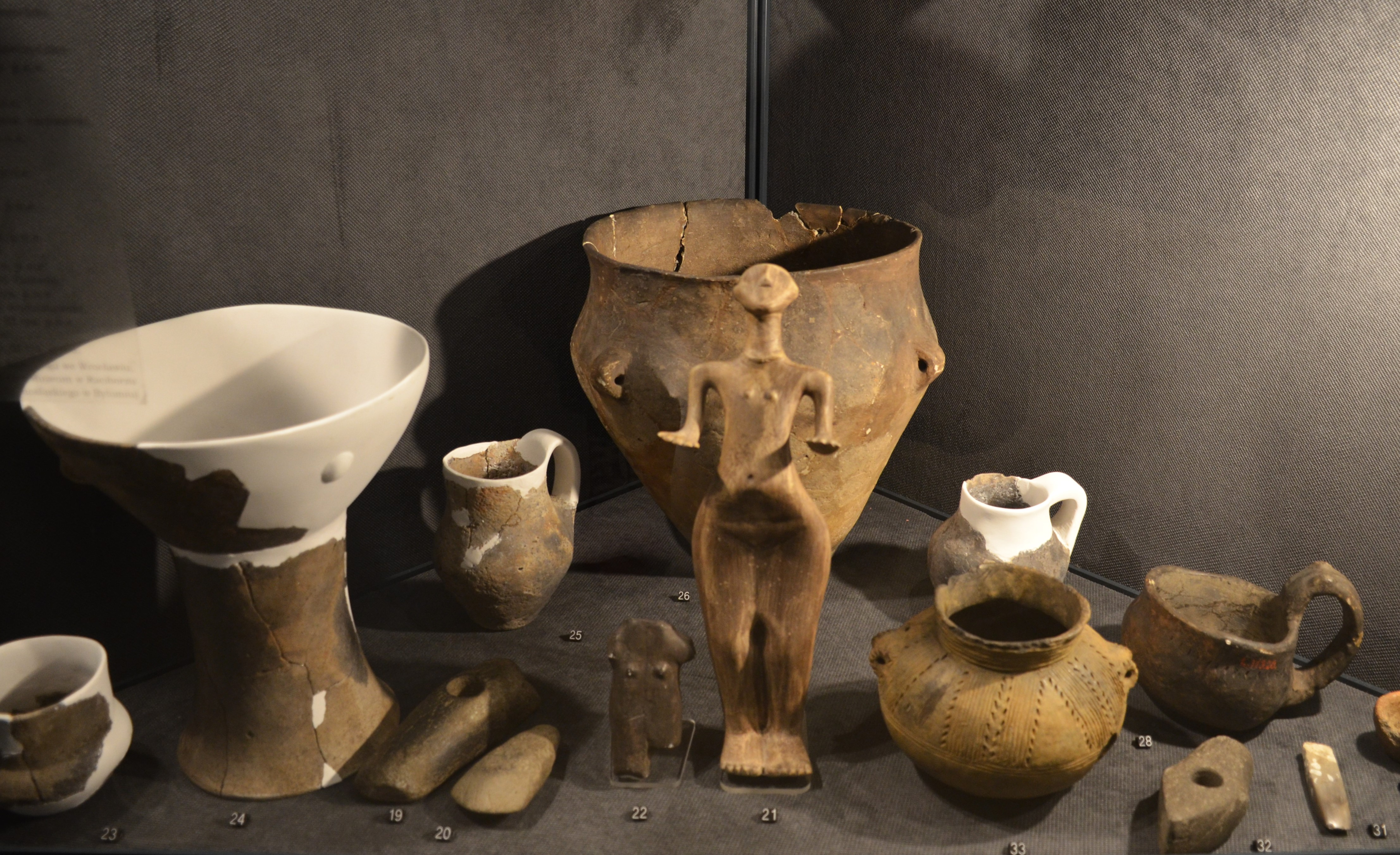

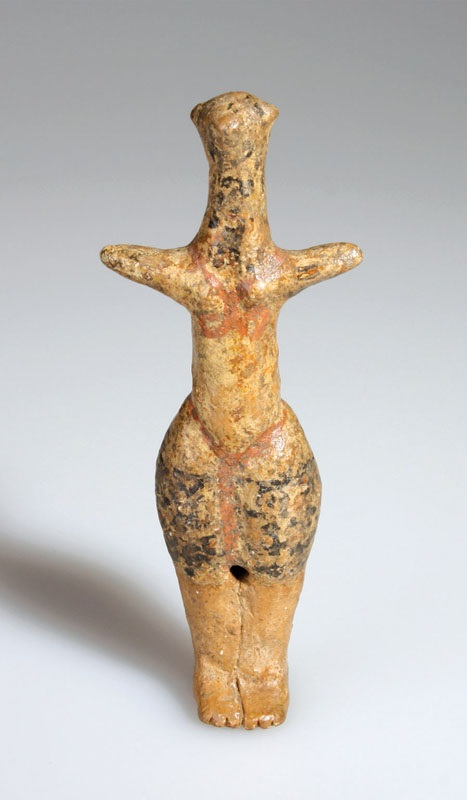
Falkenstein venus figurine

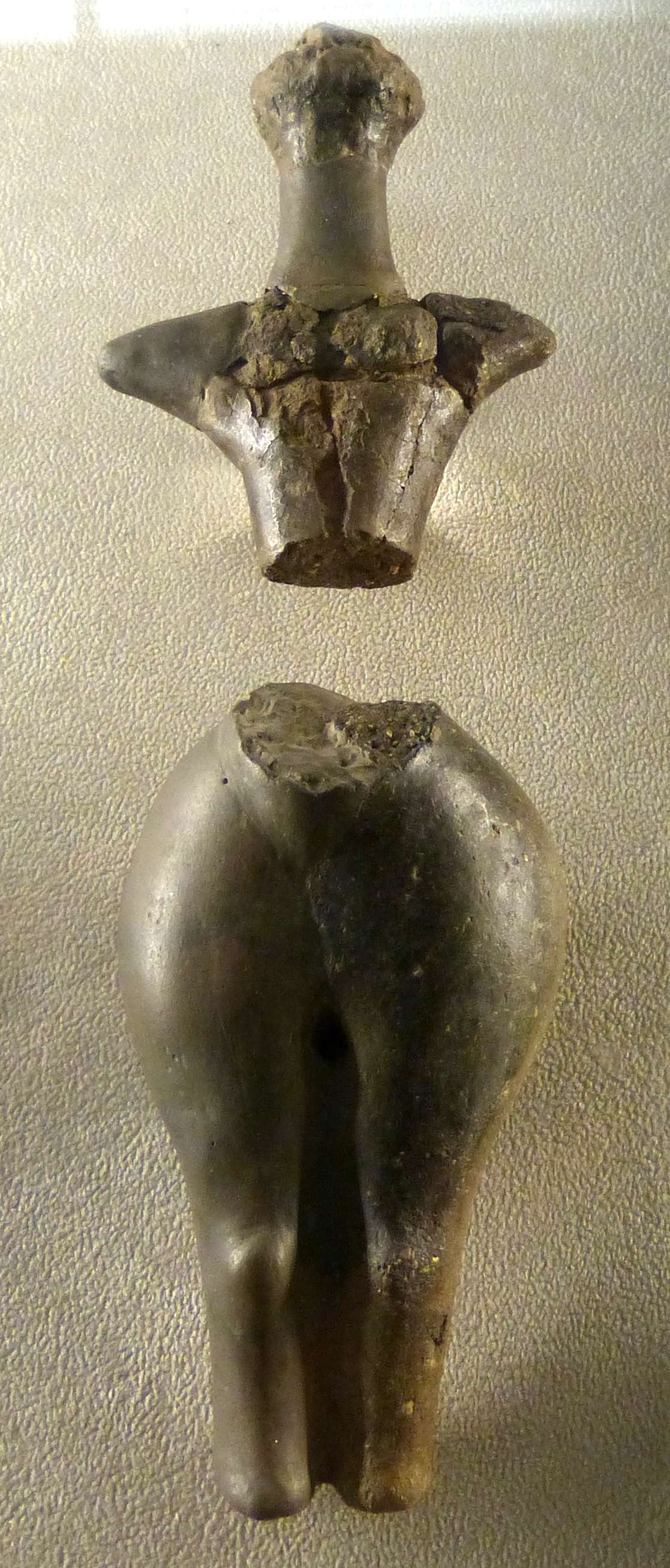
Wetzleinsdorf venus figurine

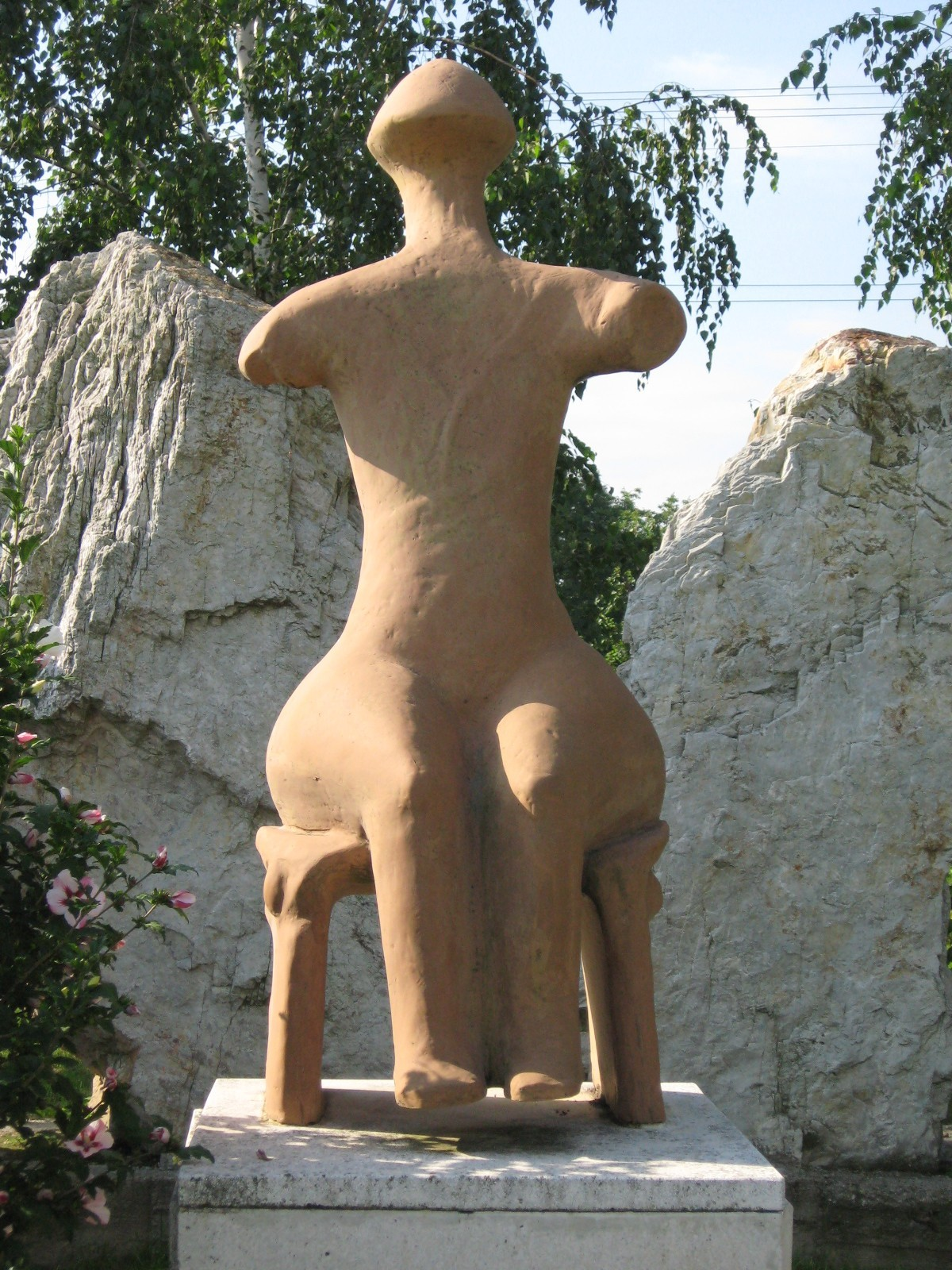
Modern sculpture of a figurine found at Nitriansky Hradok

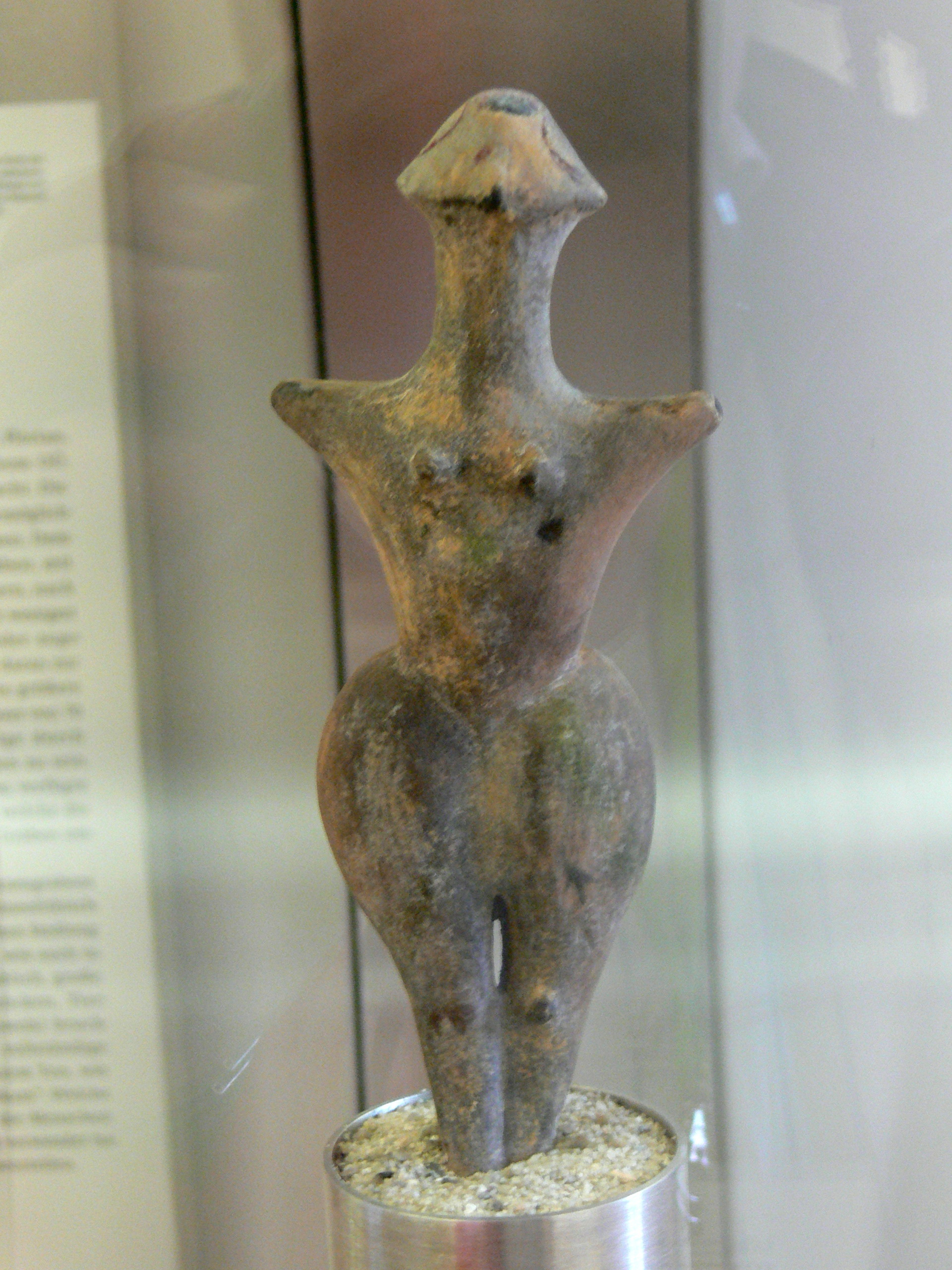
Ölkam venus, Austria, c. 4500 BC

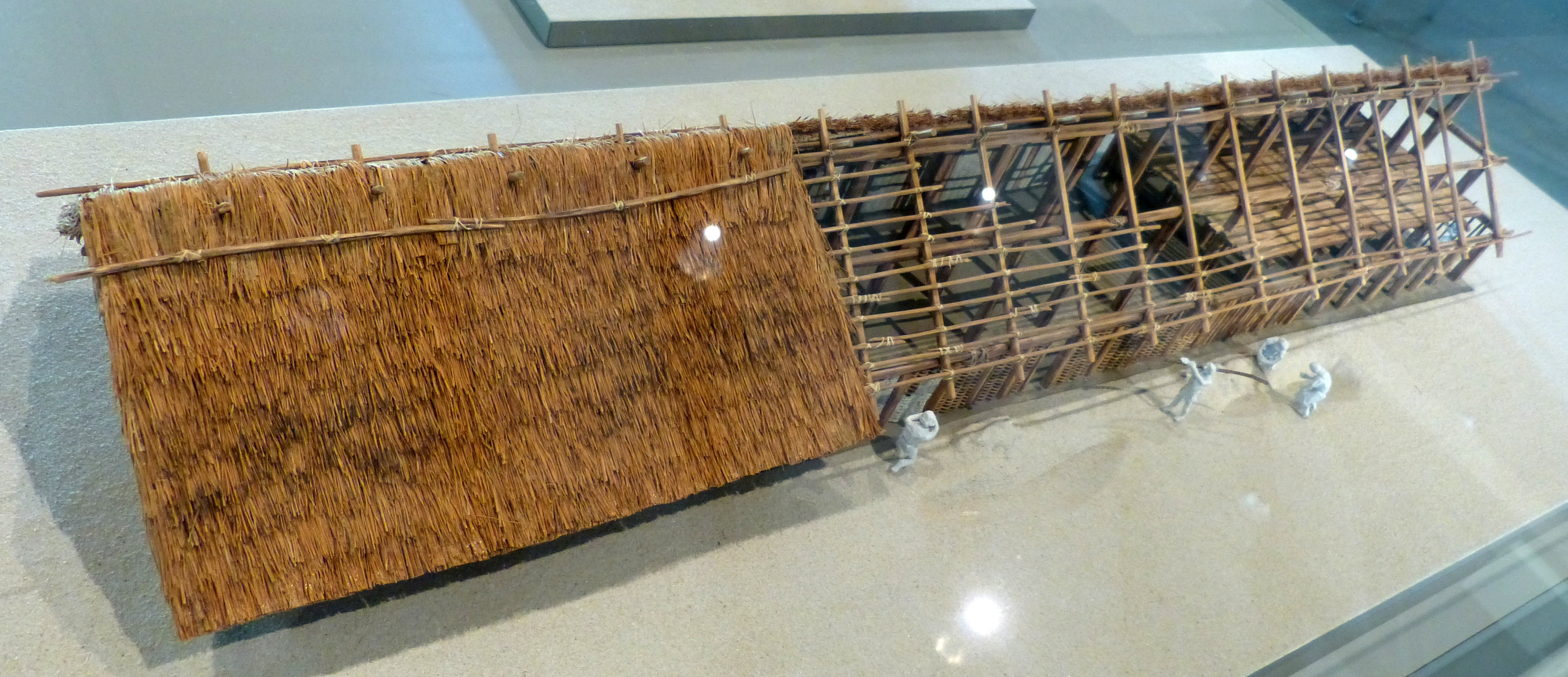
Neolithic long house

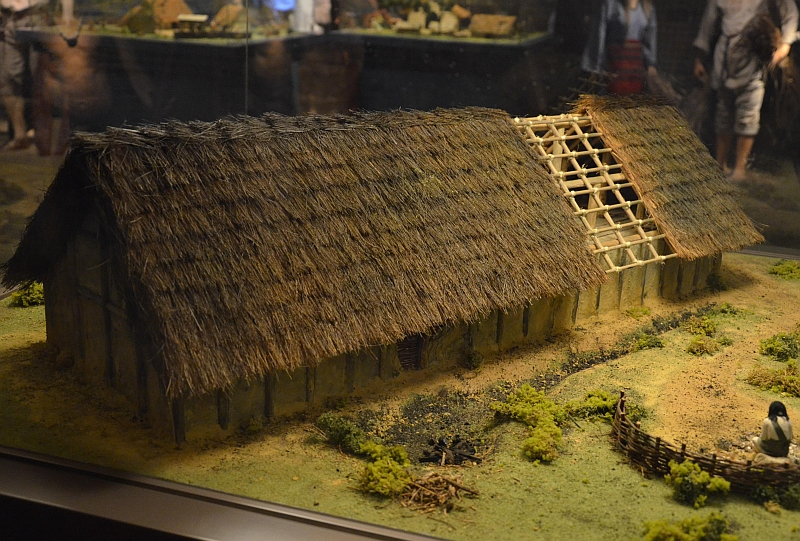
House model

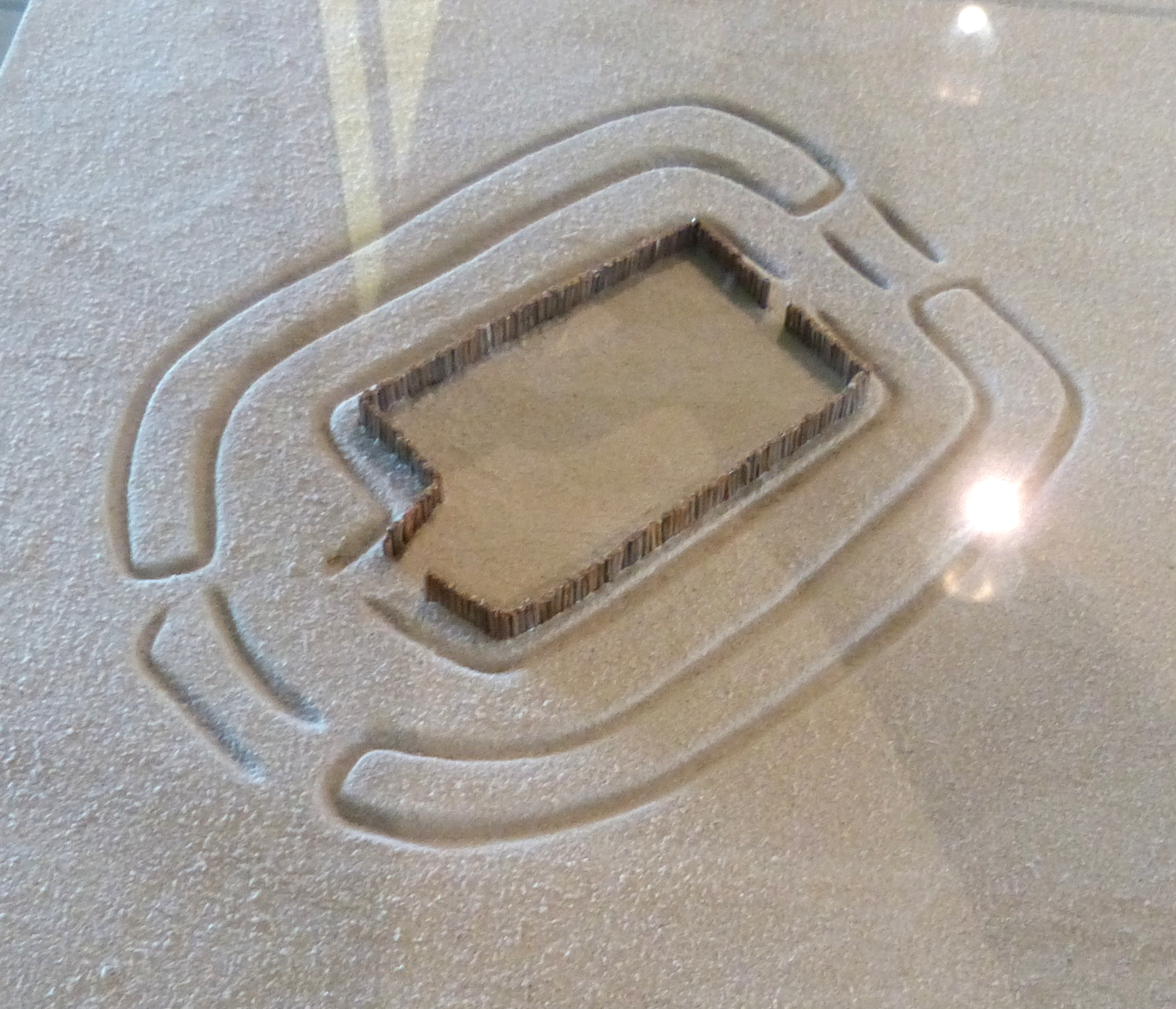
Ditched enclosure, Altheim culture

=== Jordanów culture ===
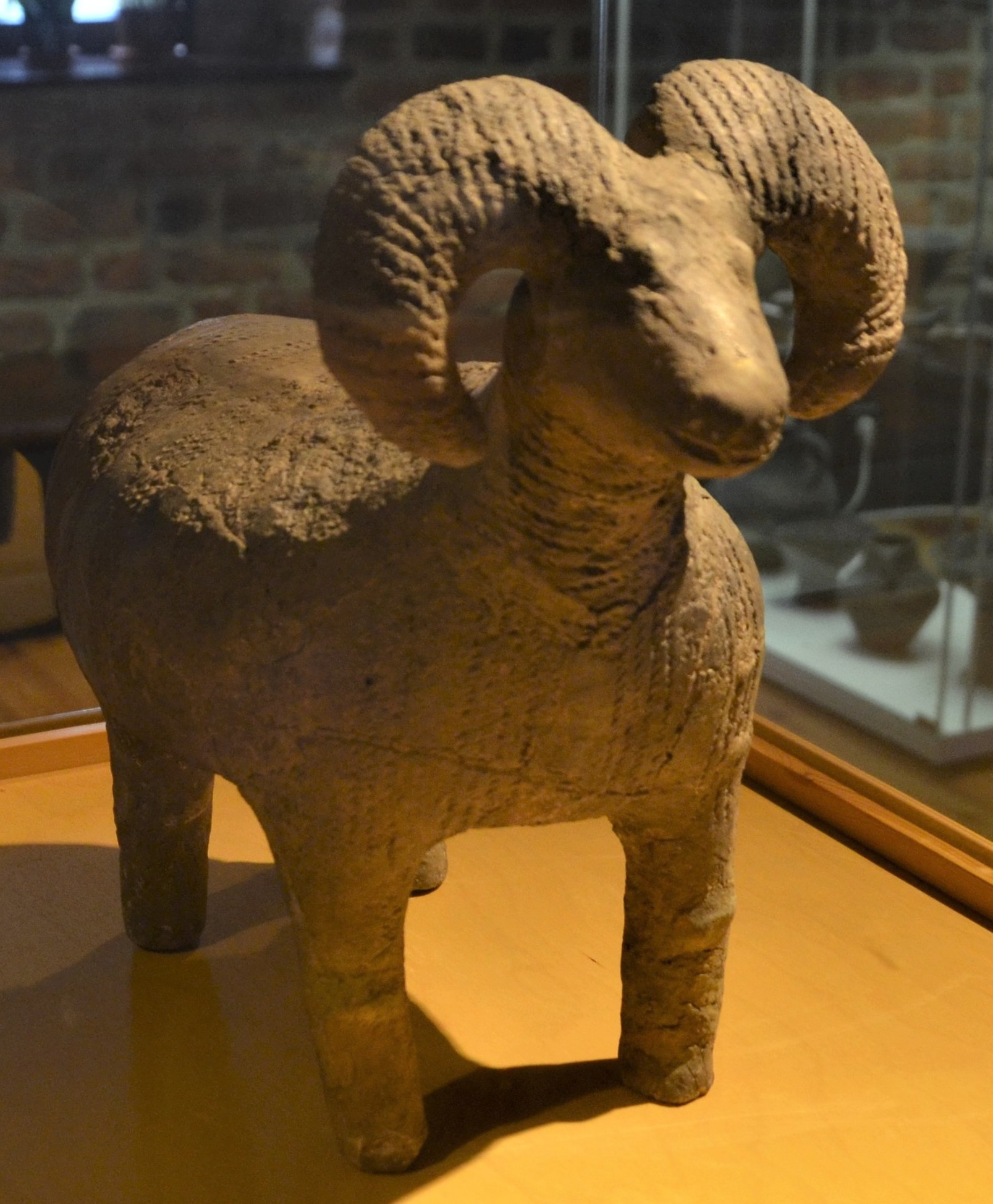
Ram sculpture, Poland

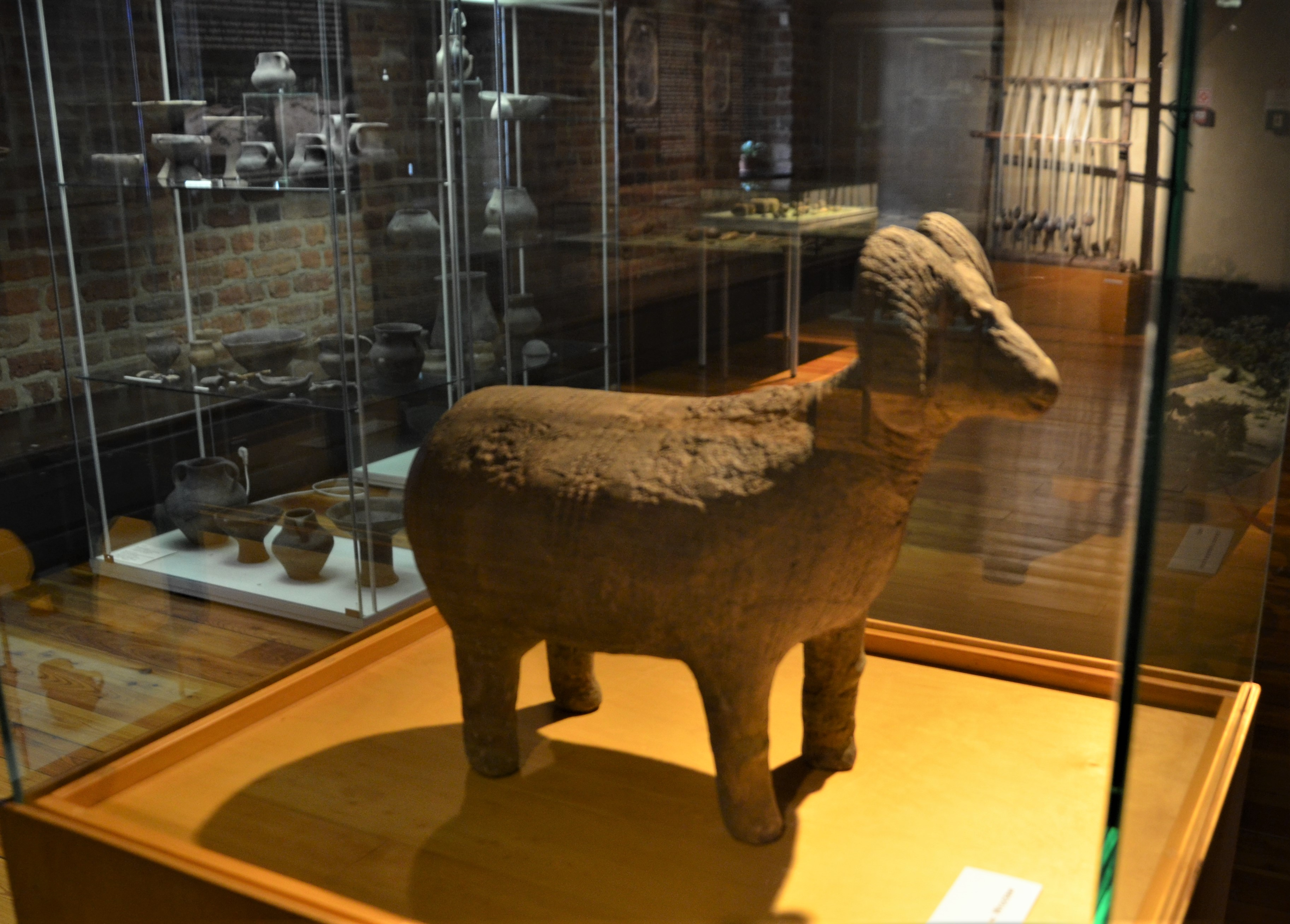

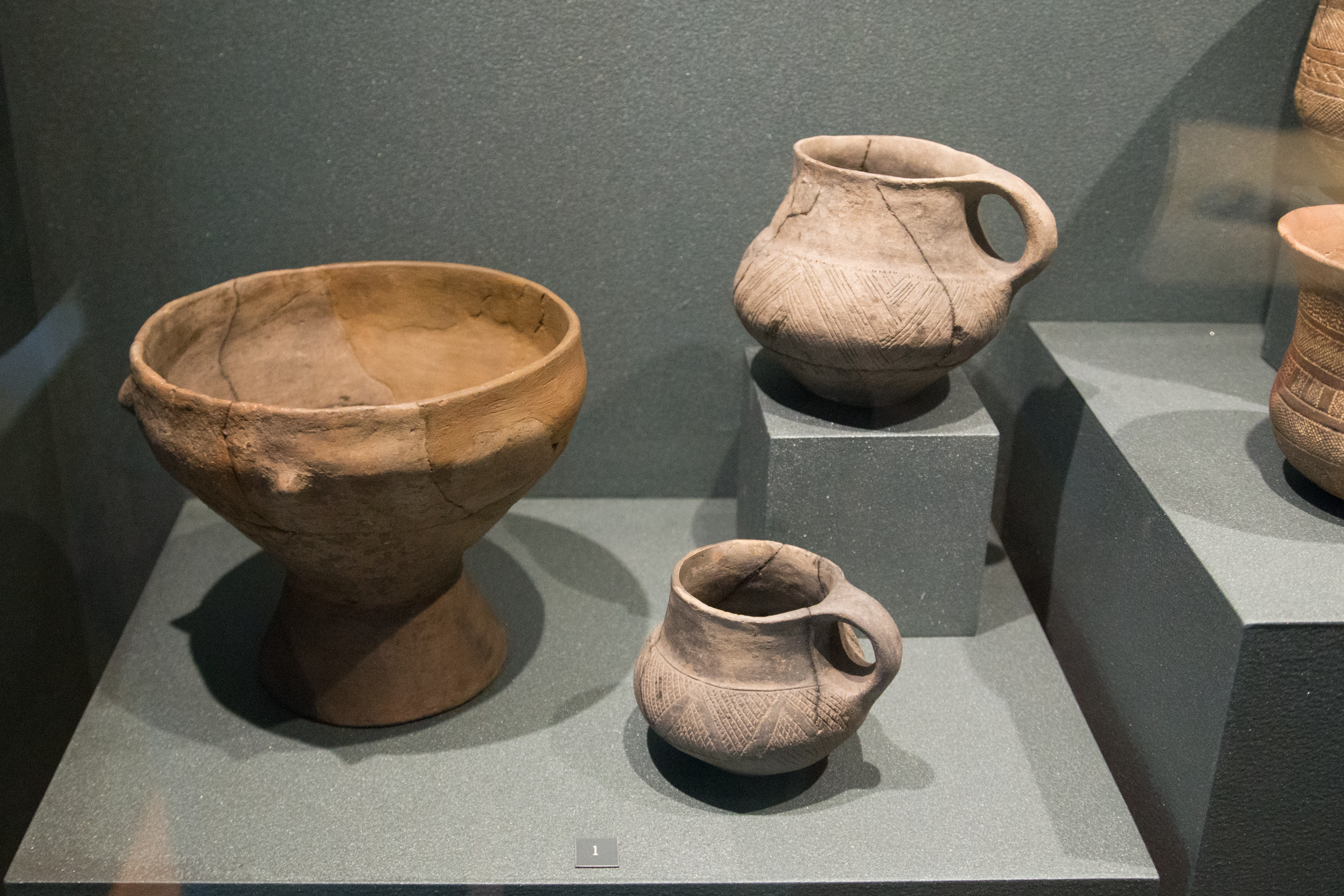
Jordanow pottery

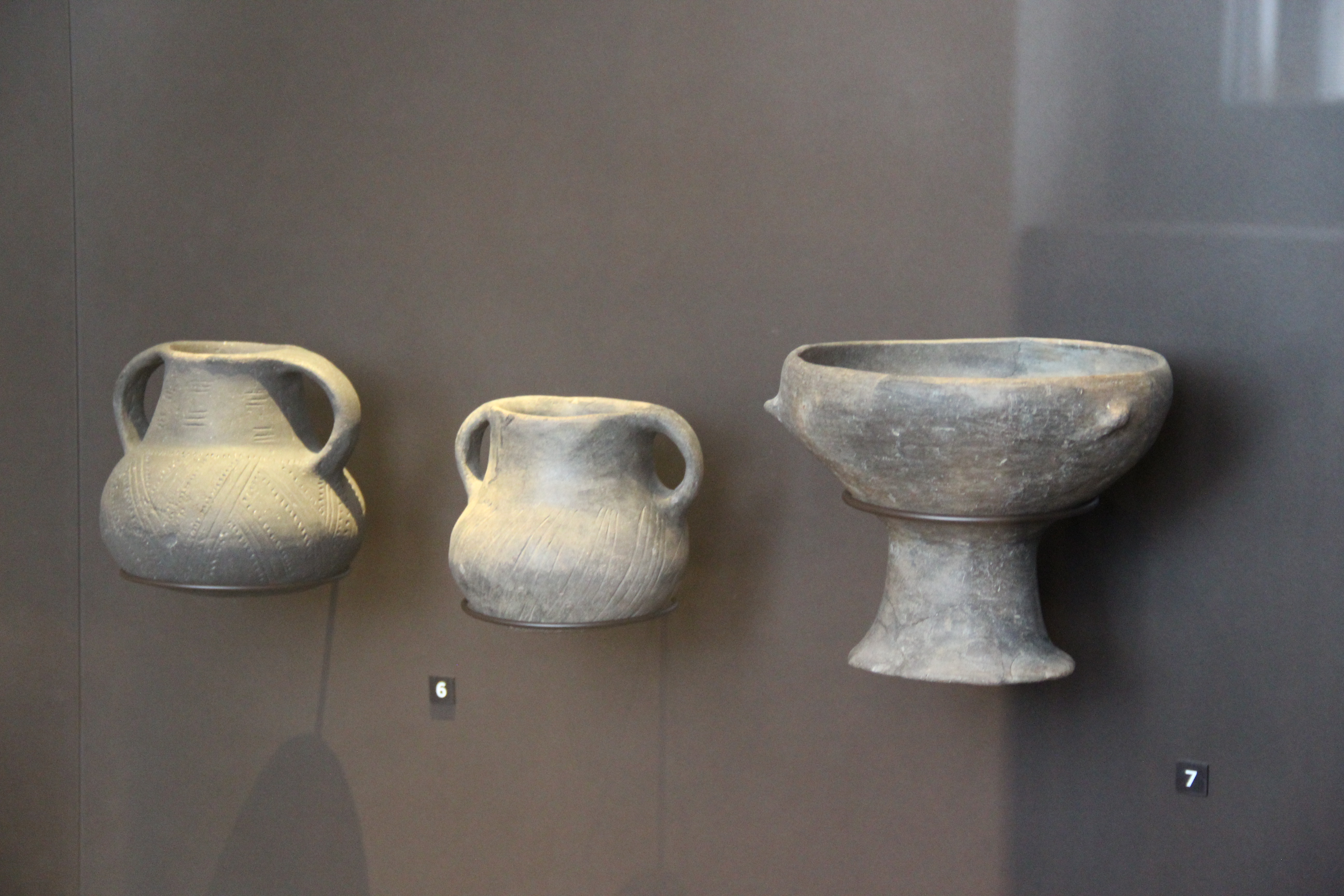
Pottery

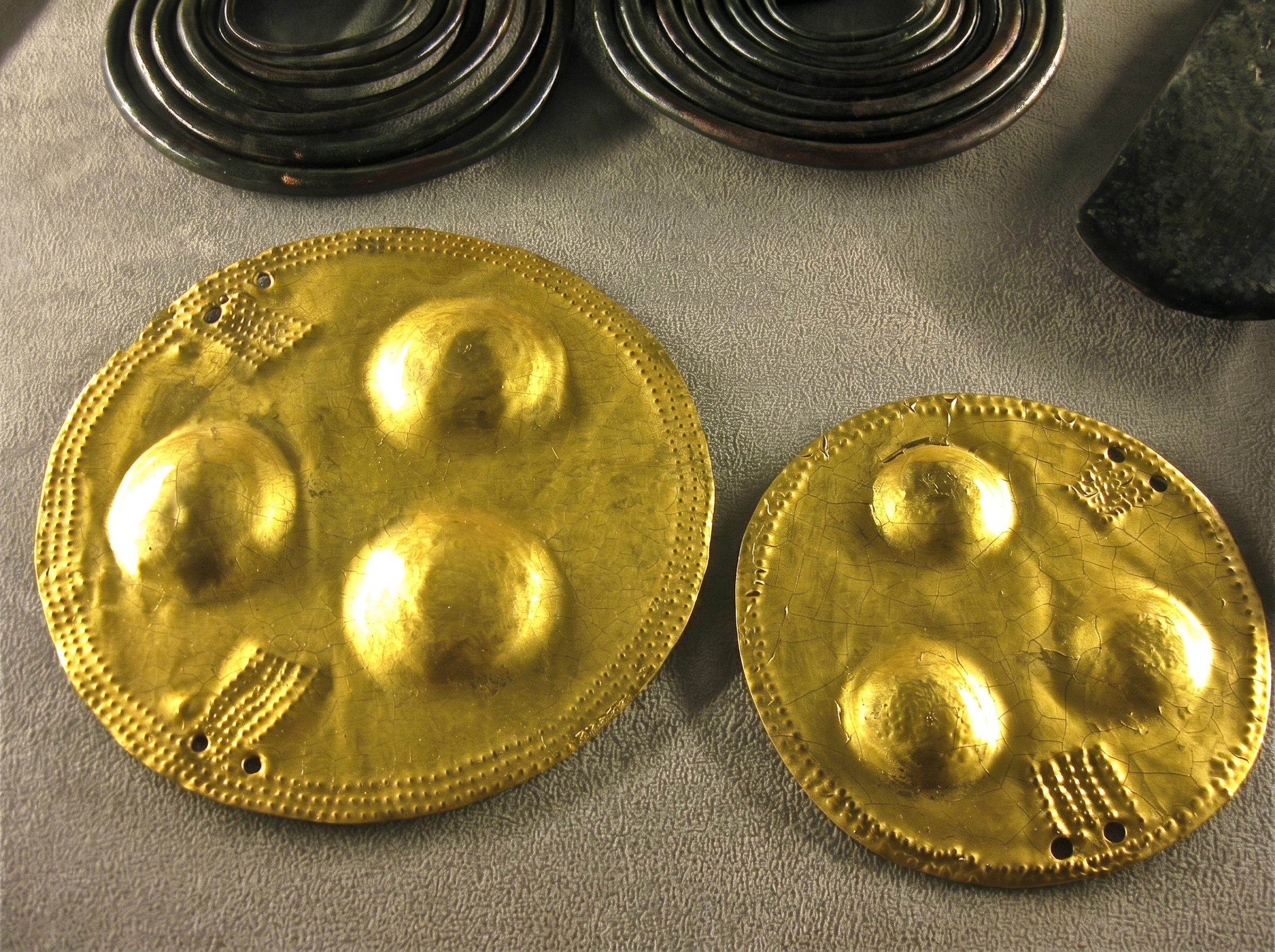
Stollhof Hoard, Austria, c. 4000 BC.

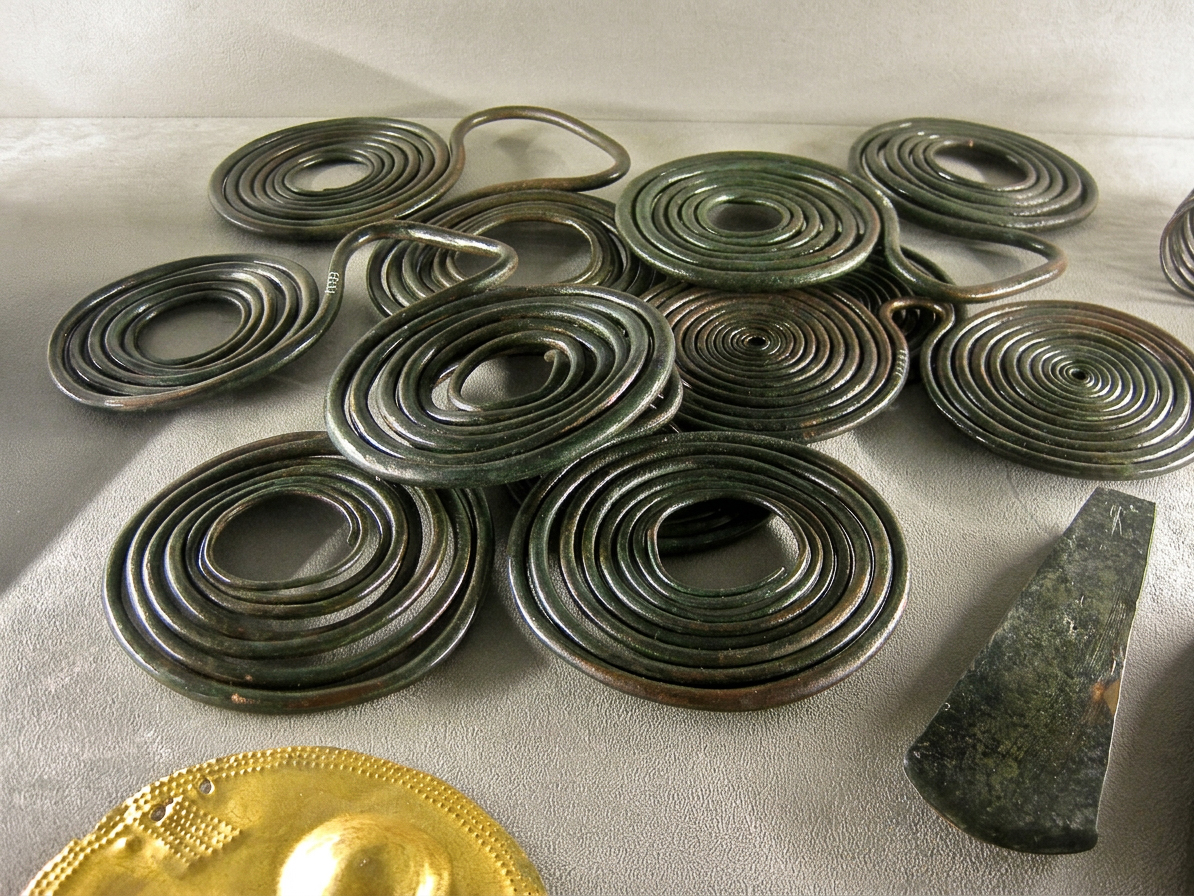
Stollhof hoard

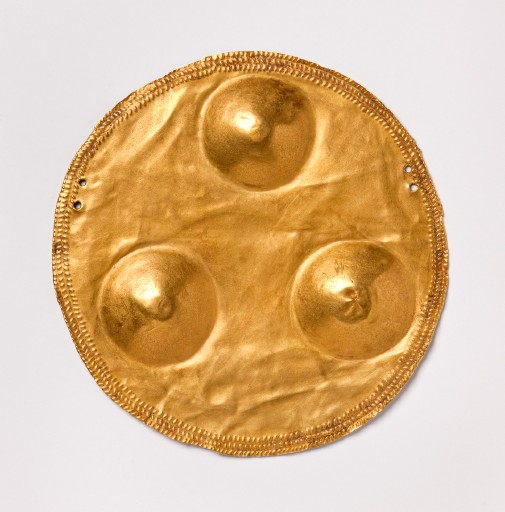
Gold disc

== See also ==
- Circular Enclosures
- Altheim culture
- Cucuteni culture
- Vinca culture
- Yamna culture
- Prehistoric Europe

== Sources ==
- Bánffy, Eszter (1997). Cult Objects of the Neolithic Lengyel Culture: Connections and Interpretation. David Brown Book Co. ISBN 978-963-8046-16-1.
- Lipson, Mark (November 16, 2017). "Parallel palaeogenomic transects reveal complex genetic history of early European farmers". Nature. 551 (7680). Nature Research: 368–372. Bibcode:2017Natur.551..368L. doi:10.1038/nature24476. PMC 5973800. PMID 29144465.
- Narasimhan, Vagheesh M. (September 6, 2019). "The formation of human populations in South and Central Asia". Science. 365 (6457) eaat7487. American Association for the Advancement of Science. bioRxiv 10.1101/292581. doi:10.1126/science.aat7487. PMC 6822619. PMID 31488661.
- Patterson, Nick; et al. (2022). "Large-scale migration into Britain during the Middle to Late Bronze Age" (PDF). Nature. 601 (7894): 588–594. Bibcode:2022Natur.601..588P. doi:10.1038/s41586-021-04287-4. PMC 8889665. PMID 34937049. S2CID 245509501.
