= Mondsee group =

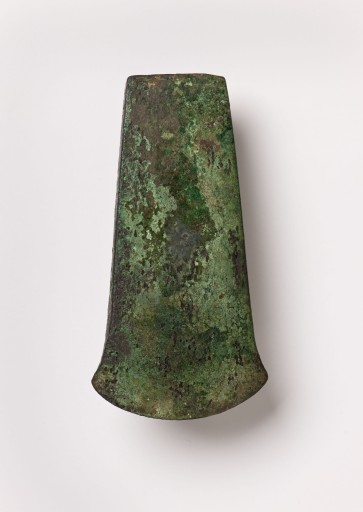
Mondsee copper axe, 4th millennium BC

The Mondsee group was a Neolithic Austrian pile-dwelling culture spanning the period from around the 4th millennium to 3rd millennium BCE, of particular interest due to its production of the characteristic "Mondsee copper" (arsenical bronze), apparently the first in central Europe to emulate the Balkan Vinča culture.

The 1854 chance discovery of a prehistoric lake village on Switzerland's Zürichsee triggered interest in neighboring countries, and pile dwellings with huge amount of artifacts were discovered by Matthäus Much from 1864 until the 1870s in two Austrian provinces, Carinthia and Upper Austria's Salzkammergut where the lake Mondsee is situated.

The graph of calibrated radiocarbon dates shows a maximum range of 3800–2800 cal BC, but dating is problematic as the dates have a very large standard deviation. Such dates therefore are only to be held of circumstantial value.

Mondsee is sometimes seen as a "culture" in its own right or (usually) as a "group" within the Funnel Beaker culture/interaction sphere (TRB) of Central/Northern Europe because its pottery and stone tools show affinities. More likely is that close trade relations existed between the two cultures. It is suggested that the earliest Scandinavian copper is of Austrian origin. Much discussed is also Mondsee group's relationship with the Bavarian Altheim group. Investigations of whether its raw material was of local origin or imported are ongoing.

Ötzi the Iceman had an axe made from copper from central Italy.

== Dating ==
Calibrated radiocarbon dates date the Mondsee culture from about 3770 BC. to 2260 ±90 BC.

The reason for the abrupt end is not yet known. In 2008, the German geoarchaeologist Alexander Binsteiner discovered evidence of a prehistoric landslide on the Schafberg near See am Mondsee. This landslide, whose debris today separates Mondsee and Attersee (course of the Seeache), could have wiped out the culture in an inland tsunami. Due to an estimated 50-100 million cubic meters of rubble, the lake level of the Mondsee may have risen by two to four meters.

The lake shores of Mondsee and Attersee were probably uninhabited for about a millennium. There are only a few pile dwellings from the Early Bronze Age, which suggests hesitant resettlement. The Abtsdorf station excavated by Elisabeth Ruttkay in 1977 and the Attersee group derived from it should be mentioned here. Based on the pottery, a classification into the Early Bronze Age levels A2/B1 according to Reinecke is possible.

== Gallery ==
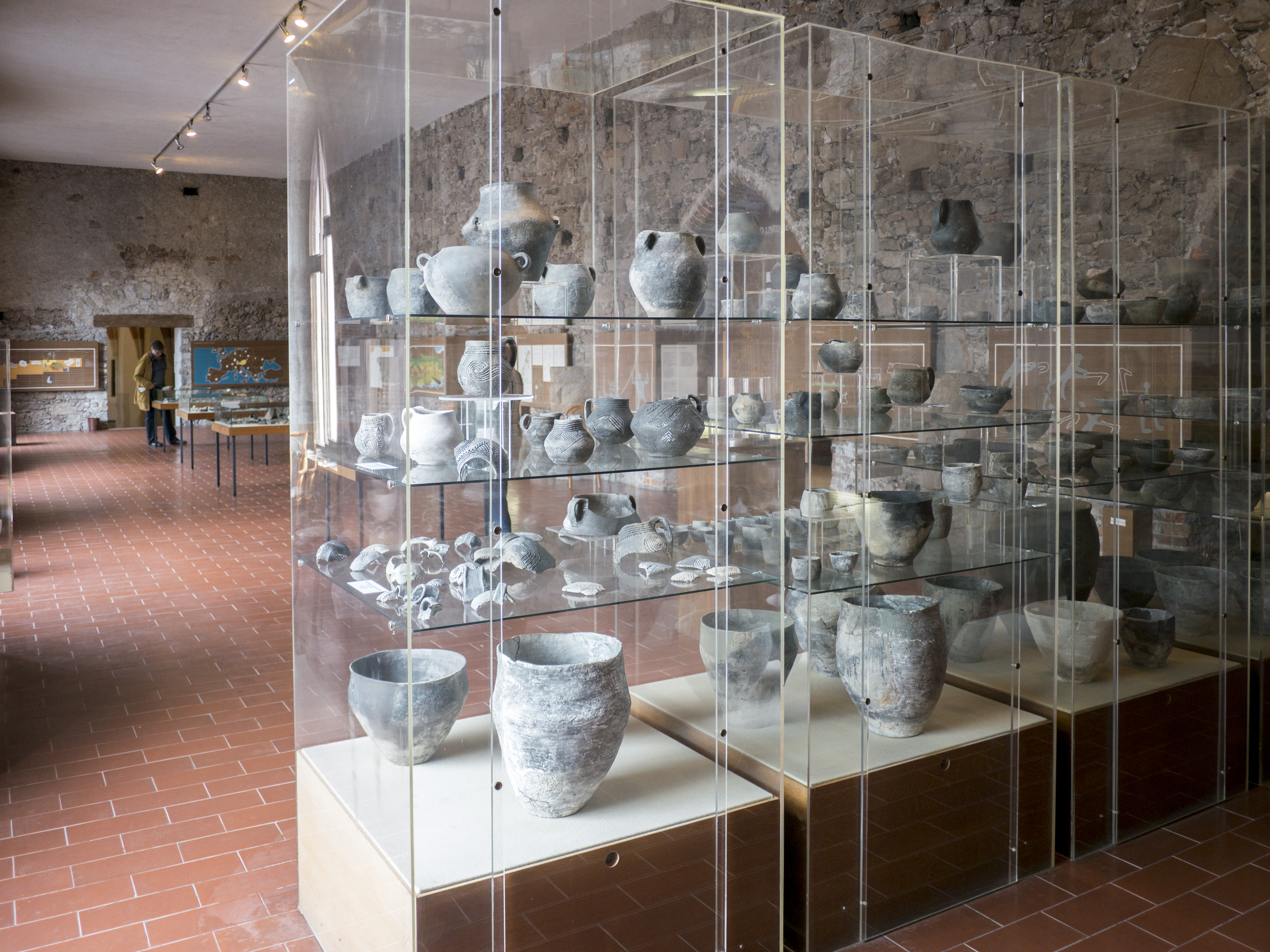

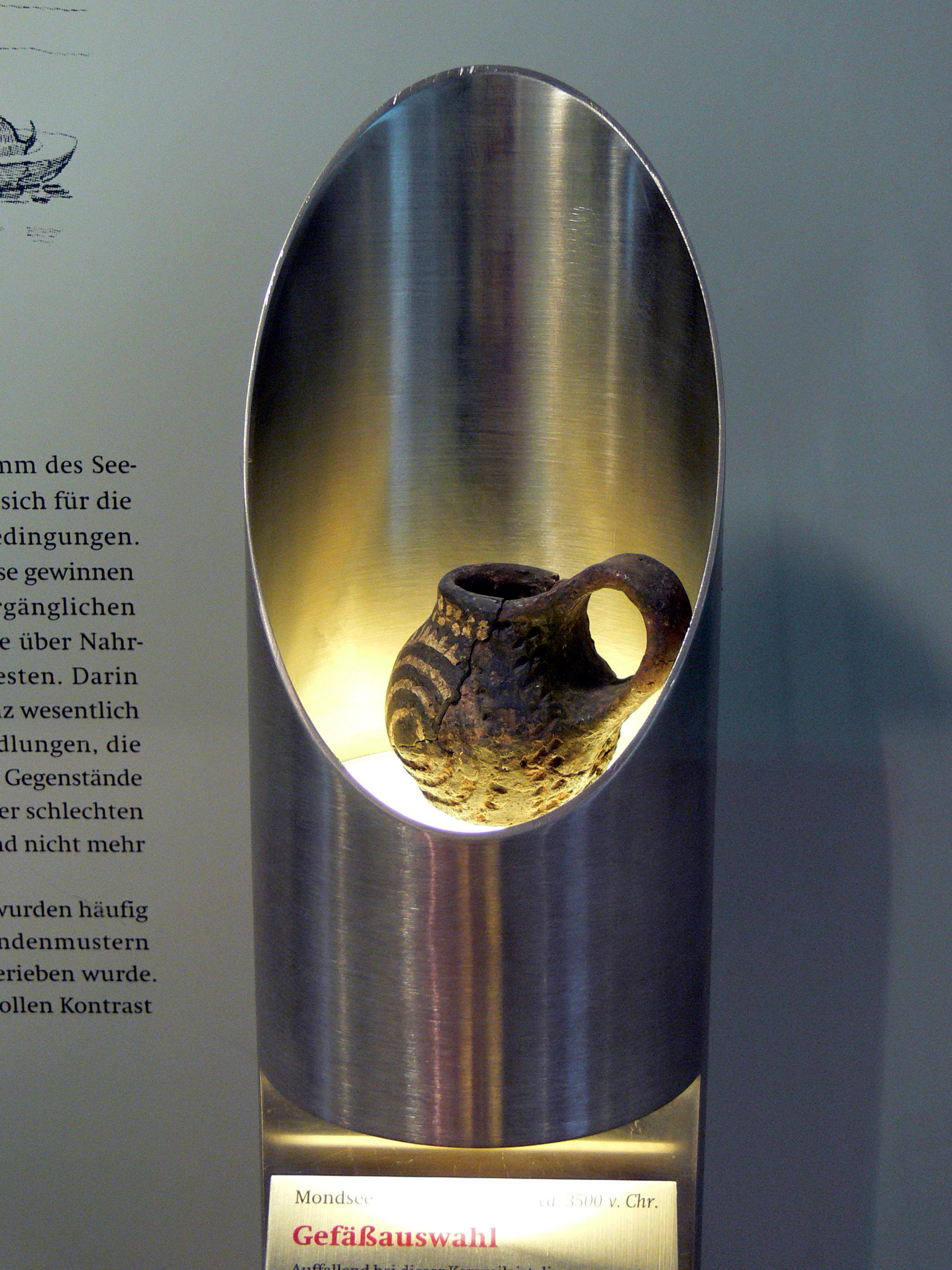

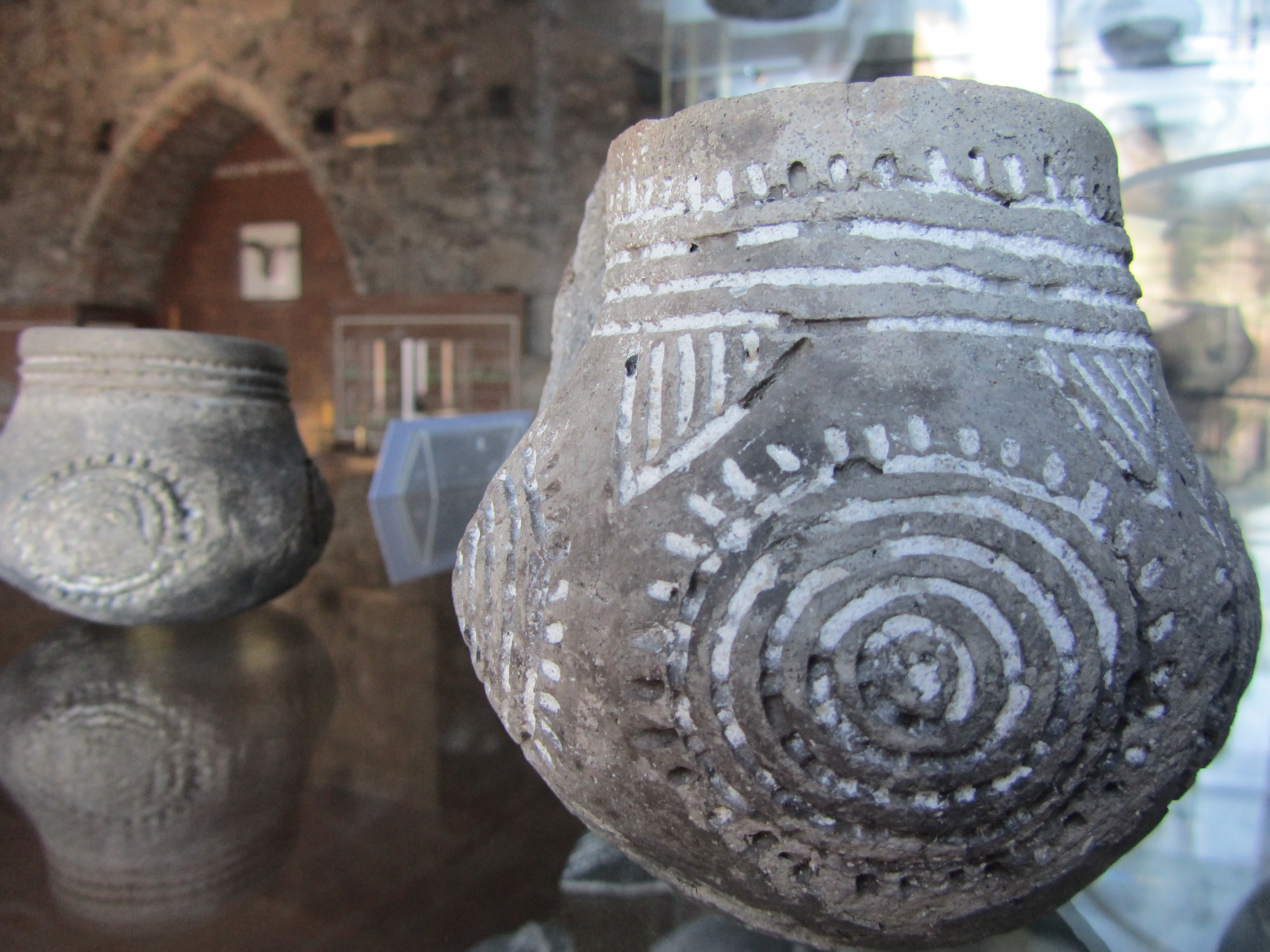

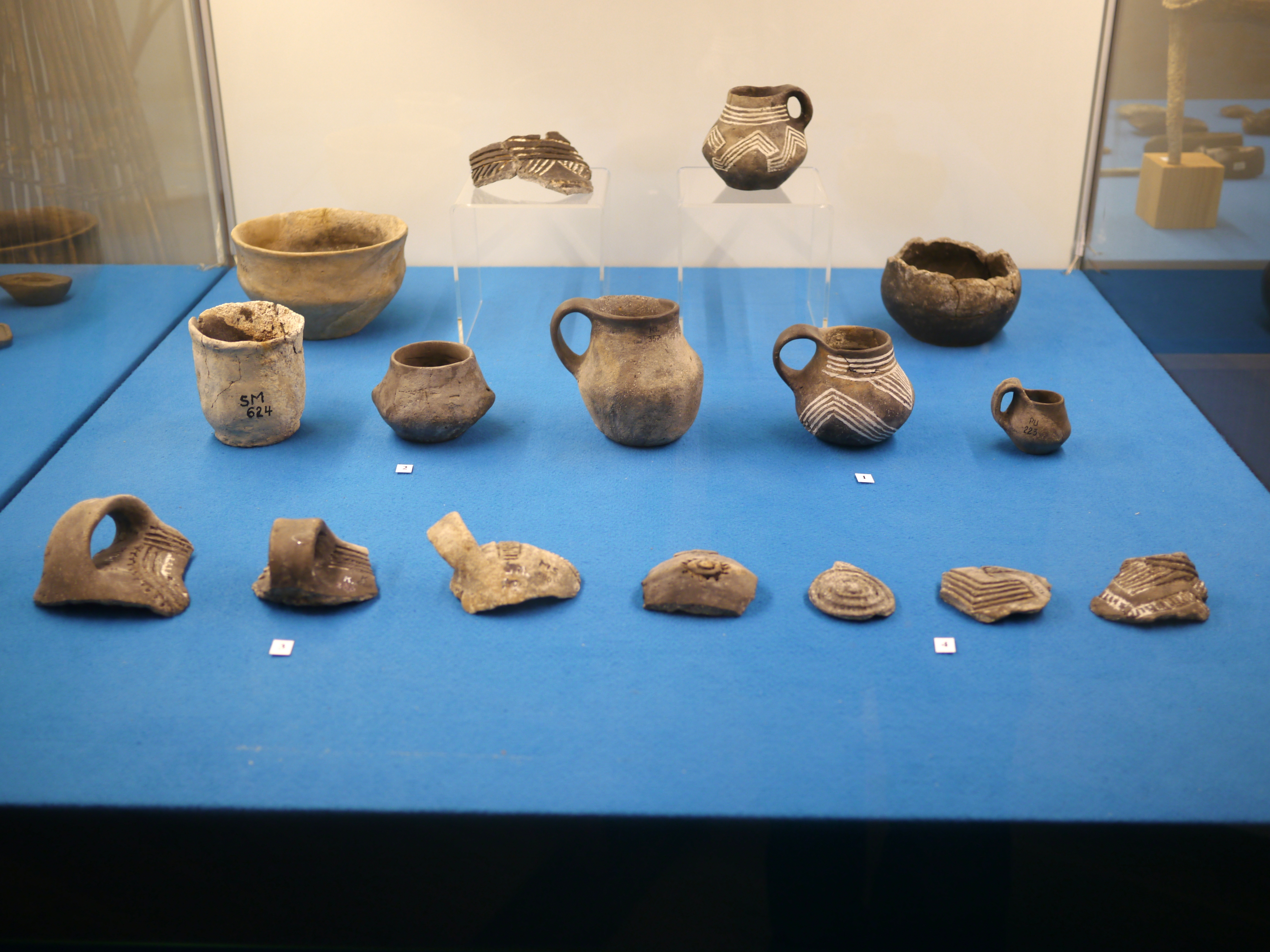

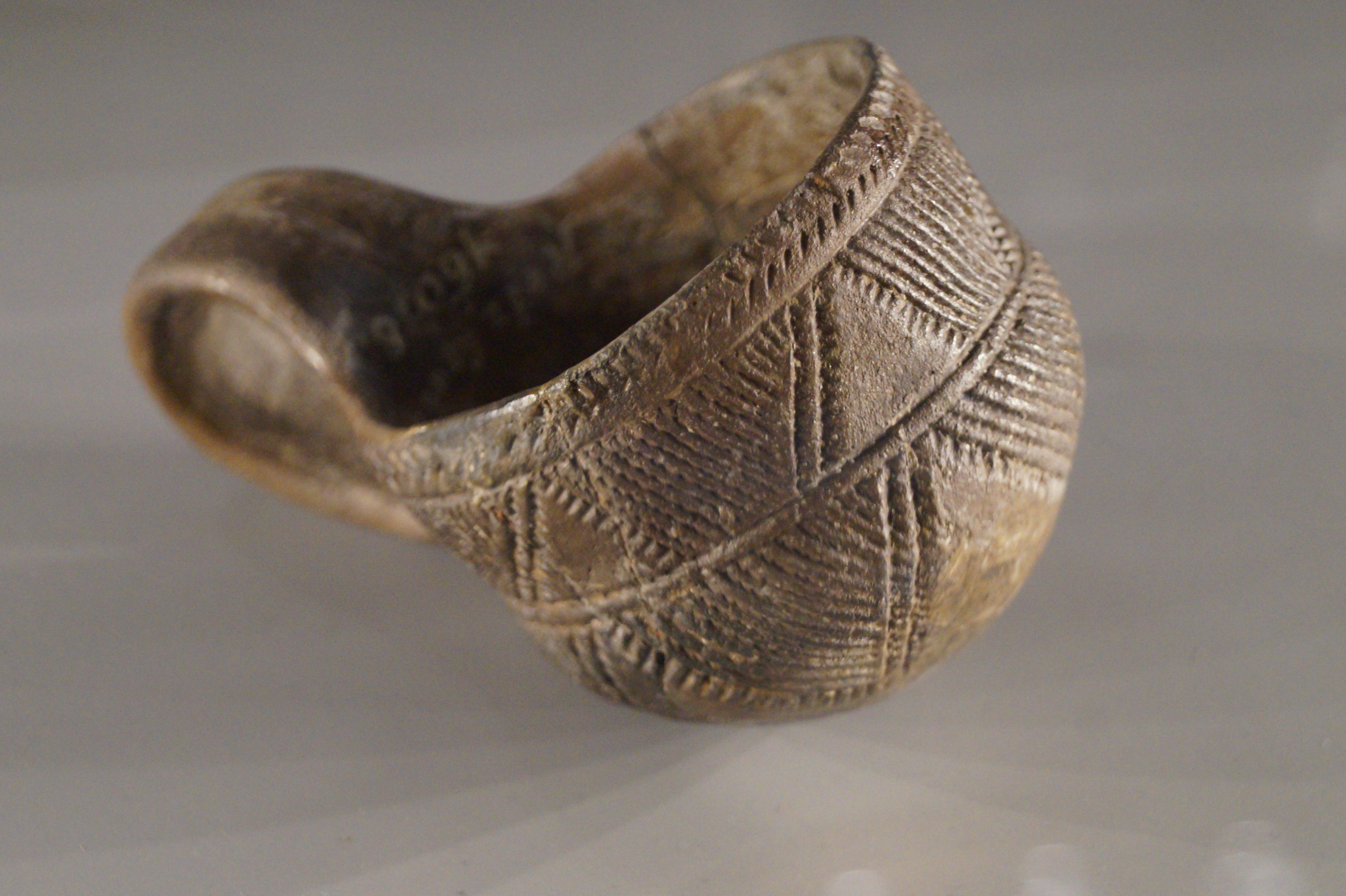

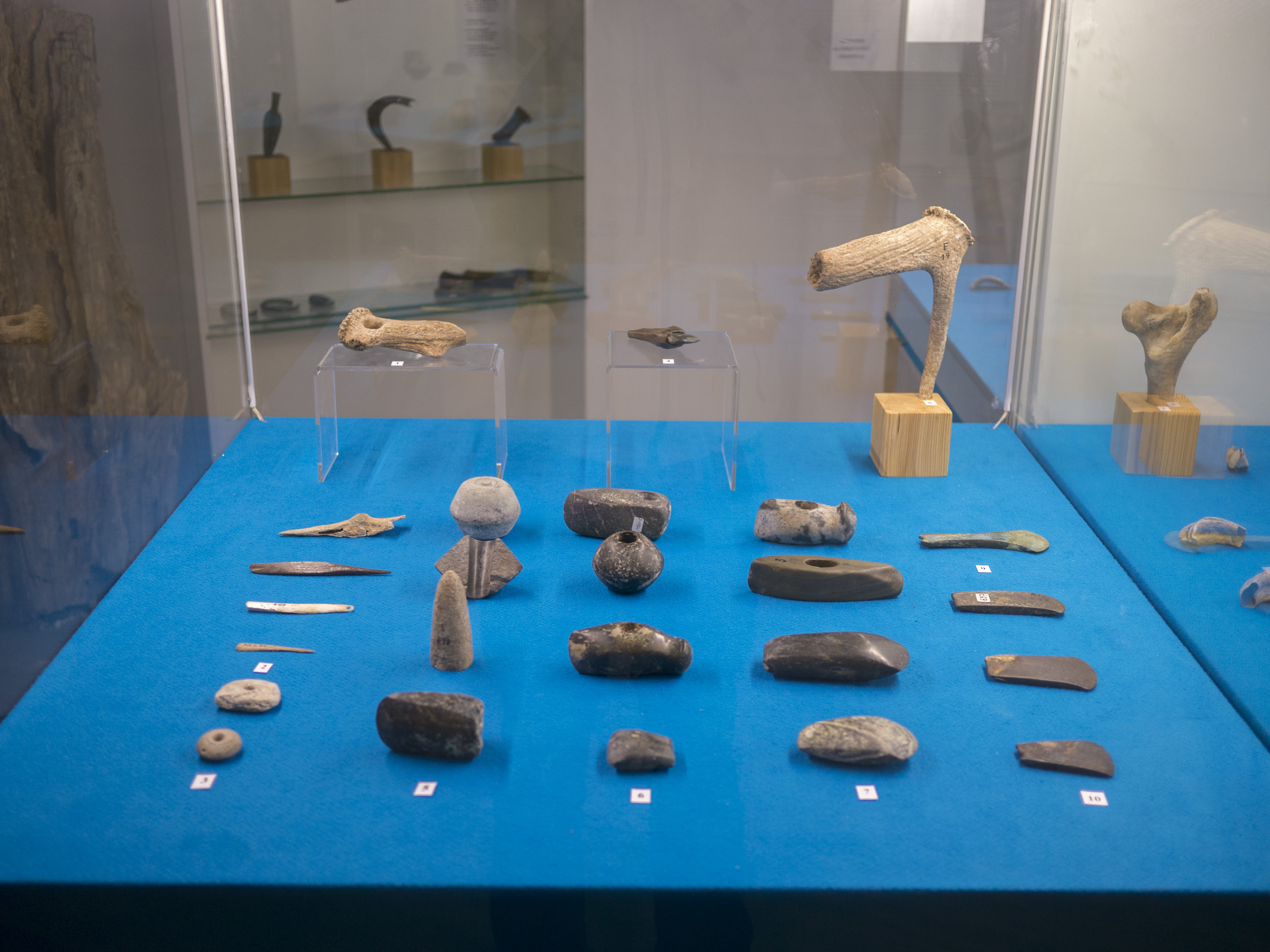

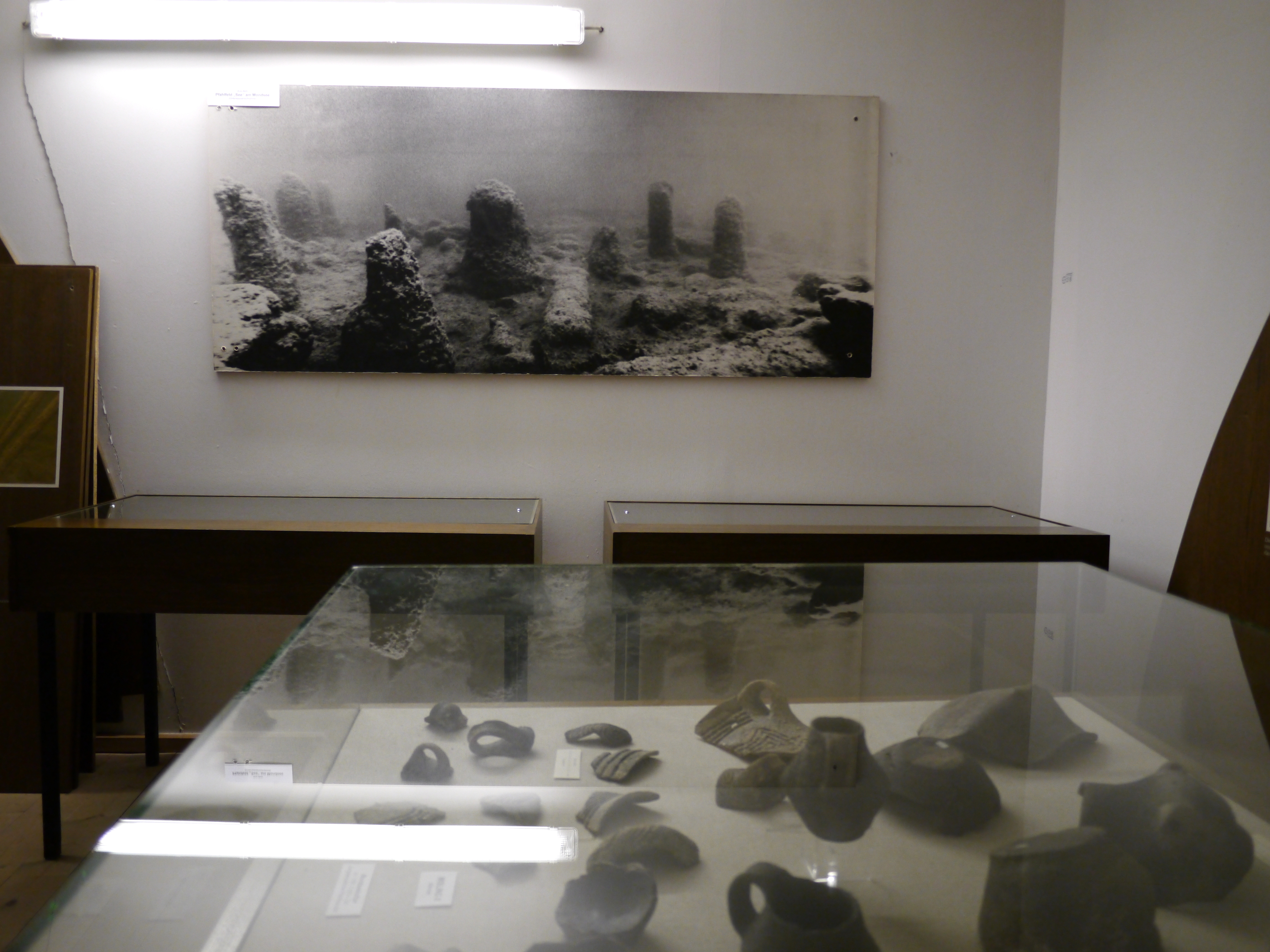

== Sources ==
- Francesco Menotti, Living on the lake in prehistoric Europe: 150 years of lake-dwelling research
