= Gunter Schöbel =

German archaeologist and director of the Pfahlbau Museum Unteruhldingen

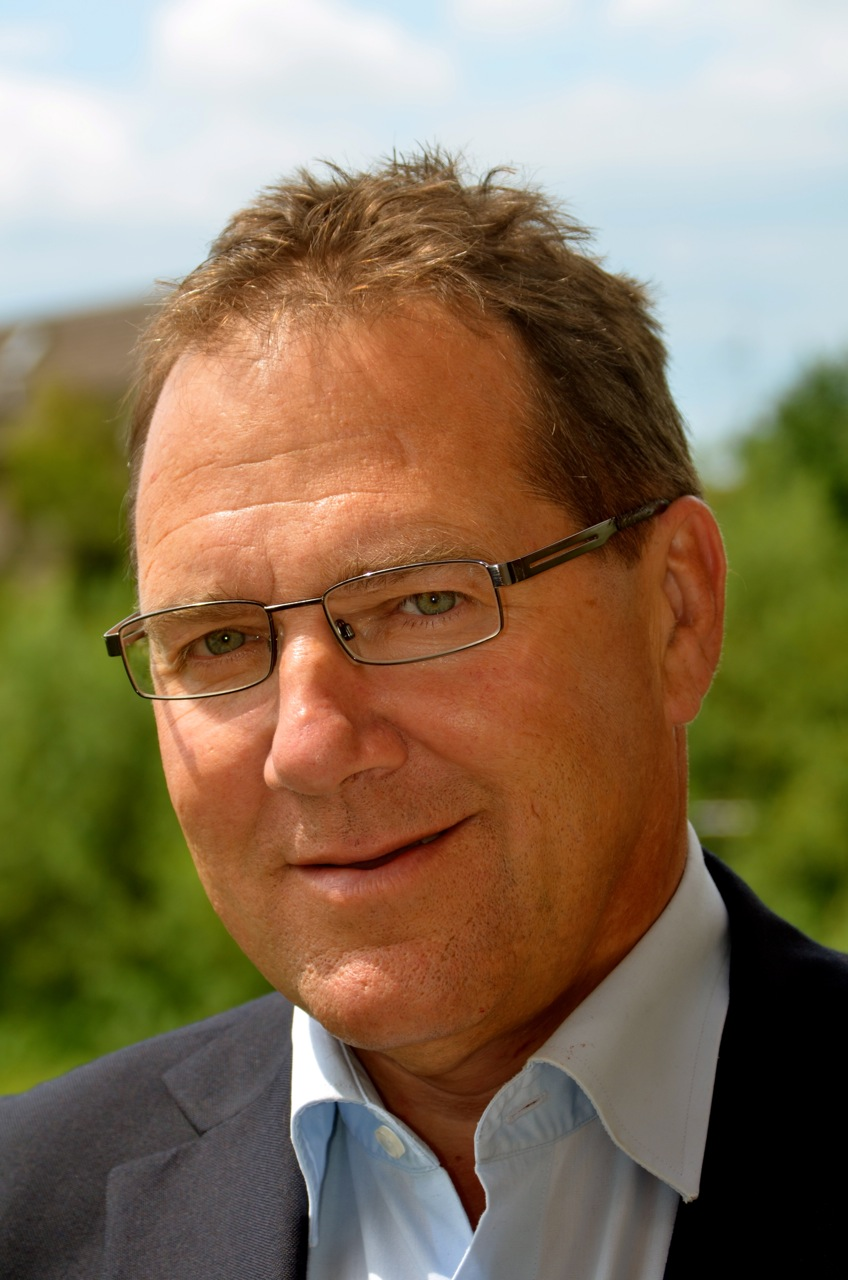
Gunter Schöbel in 2013

Gunter Schöbel (born 15 July 1959 in Stuttgart) is a German archaeologist and director of the Pfahlbau Museum Unteruhldingen.

== Career ==
Schöbel studied archaeology, anthropology and geology at the University of Tübingen from 1979 to 1982. From 1982 to 1989 the continued his studies of archaeology, geology and ethnology at the University of Freiburg. 1989 he completed his studies receiving a PhD. During his studies he worked as underwater archaeologist for the Landesamt für Denkmalpflege Baden-Württemberg. Since 1990 Schöbel worked as scientific advisor at Pfahlbau Museum Unteruhldingen. Since 1994 Schöbel is the director of the Museum. 2010 Schöbel succeeds his habilitation venia legendi at the University of Tübingen for prehistory and medieval archaeology, and since 2013 he is professor at the Institute for Pre- and Protohistory and Medieval archaeology at the same university. Since 2014 he is deputy chairman of the West and South German Association for Archaeology (WSVA) and was elected as a Vize President of the German Association for Archaeology (DVA) in 2022. In 2016 he was appointed by the DAV to organize the Archeology and Schools specialist group, which is to work together with the educational committees to improve school teaching in the federal states.

Gunter Schöbel's scientific work focuses on Neolithic and the Bronze Age archaeology, archaeology of pile dwellings at alpine lakes and bogs, experimental archaeology, archaeological research methods, archaeological open air museums, museology, museum education and the history of archaeology. Besides this, Schöbel initiated and advised the German living history documentary film series Steinzeit - Das Experiment - Leben wie vor 5000 Jahren (English: Stone age - The Experiment - Life 5000 years ago) which has been successfully presented in German television and radio in 2007, accompanied by special exhibitions in several museums.

== Honours ==
On 19 November 2013, Schöbel was appointed associate professor by Eberhard Karls University of Tübingen. In June 2021, Schöbel was awarded the Order of Merit of the Federal Republic of Germany, which was finally presented to him by Minister Nicole Razavi on 29 March 2022 due to COVID-19 pandemic-related delays.

== Publications ==
A short selection of English publications:

- Vereine in der Archäologie – top down oder bottom up? Der West- und Süddeutsche Altertumsverband (1900–2022), der Pfahlbauverein (1922–2022) und die Europäische Vereinigung zur Förderung der Experimentellen Archäologie (1990–2022) in Deutschland und Europa. In: Mitteilungen der Anthropologischen Gesellschaft in Wien (MAGW) Band 153, 2023, S. 189–210.
- Museum exhibitions, open-air museums and hands-on archaeology. In: Francesco Menotti, Aidan O'Sullivan (Ed.): The Oxford Handbook of Wetland Archaeology. Vol. 1, Oxford University Press, Oxford 2013, ISBN 978-0-19-957349-3.
- The end of the lake-dwelling settlements of the north-western alps. In: Dipartimento di Scienze Storiche Archeologiche e Antropologiche dell'Antichità, Università degli Studi di Roma La Sapienza (Ed.): Scienze dell'antichità: storia archeologia antropologia. Vol. 15, Rome 2009, ISBN 978-8871404400, ISSN 1123-5713, pp. 596–619.
- Museum guide / Pfahlbau-Museum Unteruhldingen, Bodensee. Pfahlbaumuseum, Unteruhldingen 2010, ISBN 978-3-9813625-0-3.
- What you always wanted to know about the life of the prehistoric lake dwellers ... : 50 answers to the most frequently asked questions of visitors at the Lake Dwelling Museum Unteruhldingen; the Delphi project: house of questions ... Pfahlbaumuseum, Unteruhldingen 2005.

=== Editor ===
- The legacy of the pile dwellers – Fascination world heritage Pfahlbaumuseum Unteruhldingen. Pfahlbaumuseum, Unteruhldingen 2012, ISBN 978-3-944255-00-2.
- EuroREA (re)construction and experiment in archaeology, European platform. Hradek Králové, ISSN 1214-9551.
- LiveARCH workshop report. Historisch OpenluchtMuseum, Eindhoven (NL) / Pfahlbaumuseum, Unteruhldingen 2010, ISBN 978-3-9813625-1-0.
- Living history in archaeological open air museums. Pfahlbaumuseum, Unteruhldingen 2005, ISBN 978-3-9813625-3-4.
