= Altheim =

Altheim may refer to:

== Places ==
=== Austria ===
- Altheim, Austria, a town in Upper Austria

=== Germany ===
- Altheim, Biberach, a municipality in the district of Biberach, Baden-Württemberg
- Altheim (Alb), a municipality in the district of Alb-Donau, Baden-Württemberg
- Altheim (Ehingen), a municipality in the district of Alb-Donau, Baden-Württemberg
- Altheim, a district of Münster, Darmstadt-Dieburg, Hessen; formerly called "Spitzaltheim"

=== United States ===
- Altheim, the former name of Town and Country, Missouri, a city in St. Louis County

== People ==
- Franz Altheim (1898–1976), German scholar
