= Altheim culture =

Archaeological culture

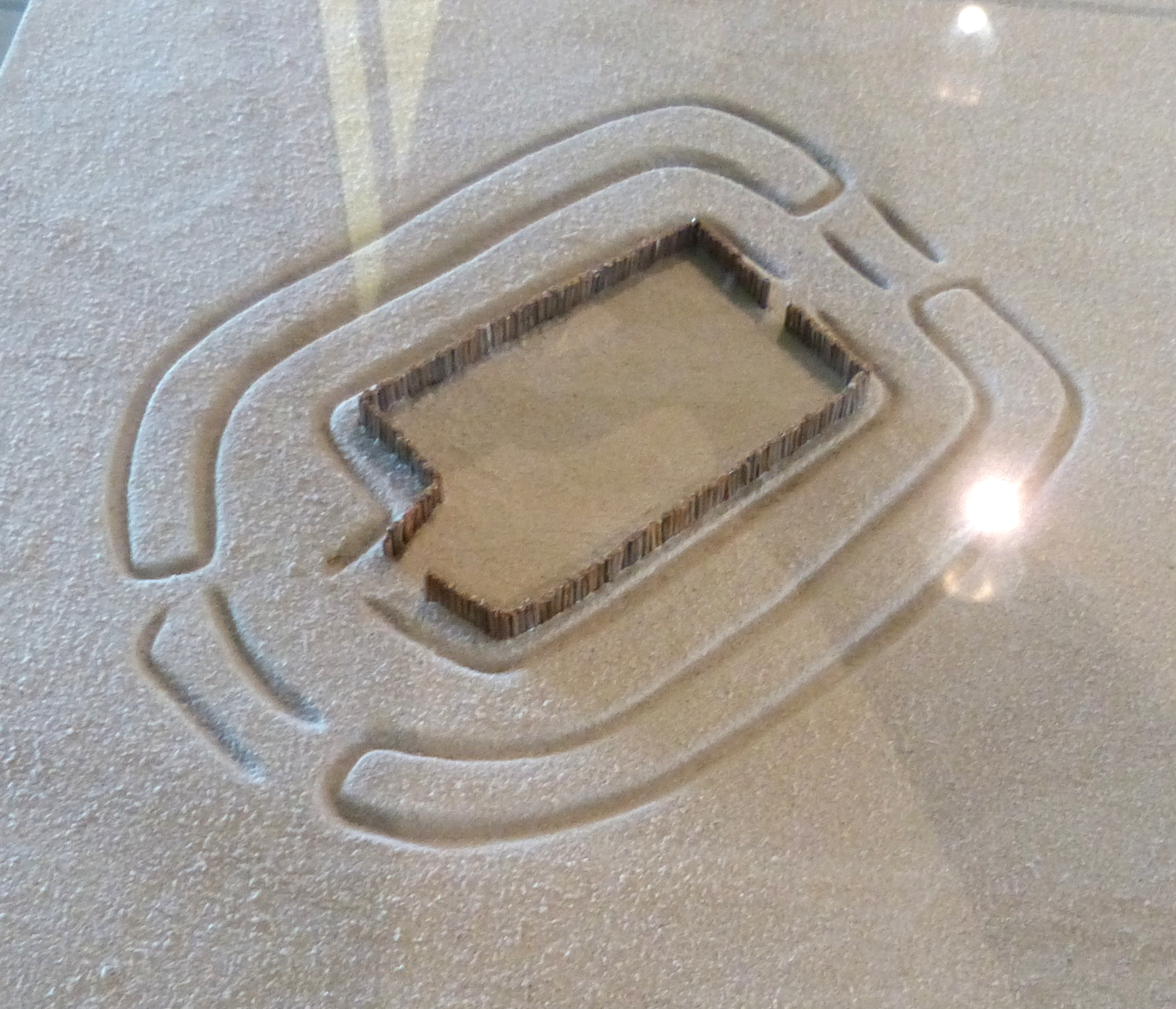
Ditched enclosure in Altheim, Germany

Altheim culture (Altheim group) is a Chalcolithic culture that derives its name from the town of Altheim. It is also a subgroup of Lengyel culture. Not defined until 1915 by the German Prehistorian Paul Reinecke after finds from a Causewayed enclosure 1000 m northwest of Altheim (Essenbach), Landshut (district), in Lower Bavaria, Southeastern Germany.

The Altheim culture sites range from the Inn (river) in the East to the Lech (river) in the West and from the Alb hills in the North to the foothills of the Alps in the South.

The Altheim culture dates to between 3800 and 3400 BC, i.e. the Younger Neolithic of Southern Central Europe, formerly called the Chalcolithic.

Contemporaneous phenomena are, to the West Pfyn culture in sw Germany and Switzerland, to the Northwest and North Michelsberg culture, to the East Baalberge group in Bohemia and to the Southeast Mondsee group. It was followed by the Corded Ware culture and Bell Beaker culture.
