= Paul Reinecke =

German prehistorian and archaeologist (1872–1958)

- Born: Paul Heinrich Adalbert Reinecke; September 25, 1872; Berlin, Prussia
- Died: May 12, 1958 (aged 85); Herrsching, Bavaria
- Occupations: Archaeologist, historian

Paul Heinrich Adalbert Reinecke (September 25, 1872 – May 12, 1958) was a German archaeologist and historian.

== Life and work ==
Reinecke was born in Berlin. He studied medicine and science under Rudolf Virchow. Interested in prehistory, he also attended classes with the anthropologist Johannes Ranke (1836–1916) and the archaeologist Adolf Furtwängler (1853–1907). During his studies, in 1893, Reinecke led an extensive study trip through Austria and Hungary.

After graduating in 1897, he worked until 1908 at the Romano-Germanic Central Museum (Mainz), and later at the Bavarian State Office for Monument Protection (Die Kunstdenkmäler von Bayern).

Until his death in 1958, he worked on almost all periods of European prehistory and early history, in particular on the chronology of the European Bronze Age and Iron Age. The names Michelsberg culture (1908) and the Altheim culture (1915) as well as the periodization of the Hallstatt culture go back to him. Particularly important are his contributions in Volume V of the "Antiquities of our pagan past" (Alterthümer unserer heidnischen Vorzeit), where he developed a chronological system, based on an historical analysis of stylistic features and on typological characteristics, that has essentially retained its validity to this day. Reinecke died in Herrsching, Bavaria.

== Awards ==
- 1942: Goethe Medal for Art and Science
- 1953: Order of Merit of the Federal Republic of Germany (Großes Verdienstkreuz der Bundesrepublik Deutschland).

== Publications ==
- Brandgräber vom Beginn der Hallstattzeit aus den östlichen Alpenländern und die Chronologie des Grabfeldes von Hallstatt. In: Mitteilungen der Anthropologischen Gesellschaft in Wien 30, 1900, S. 44 ff.
- Beiträge zur Kenntnis der frühen Bronzezeit Mitteleuropas. In: Mitteilungen der Anthropologischen Gesellschaft Wien 32, 1902, S. 104 ff.
- Zur Kenntnis der Latène-Denkmäler der Zone nordwärts der Alpen. In: Festschrift RGZM (1902) S. 53–109.
- Unsere Reihengräber der Merowingerzeit nach ihrer geschichtlichen Bedeutung. Bayerische Vorgeschichtsblätter 5, 1925, S. 54–64.
- Zur Frage "Reihengräber und Friedhöfe der Kirchen". Germania 14, 1930, 175-177.
- Spätkeltische Oppida im rechtsrheinischen Bayern. Bayerischer Vorgeschichtsfreund 9, 1930, S. 29–52.
- Bodendenkmale spätkeltischer Eisengewinnung an der untersten Altmühl (München, um 1934/35).
- Mainzer Aufsätze zur Chronologie der Bronze- und Eisenzeit (Bonn 1965). (Wiederabdruck der Aufsätze aus den 'Alterthümern unserer heidnischen Vorzeit V')
