= Altheim, Biberach =

German municipality

Altheim
- Municipality
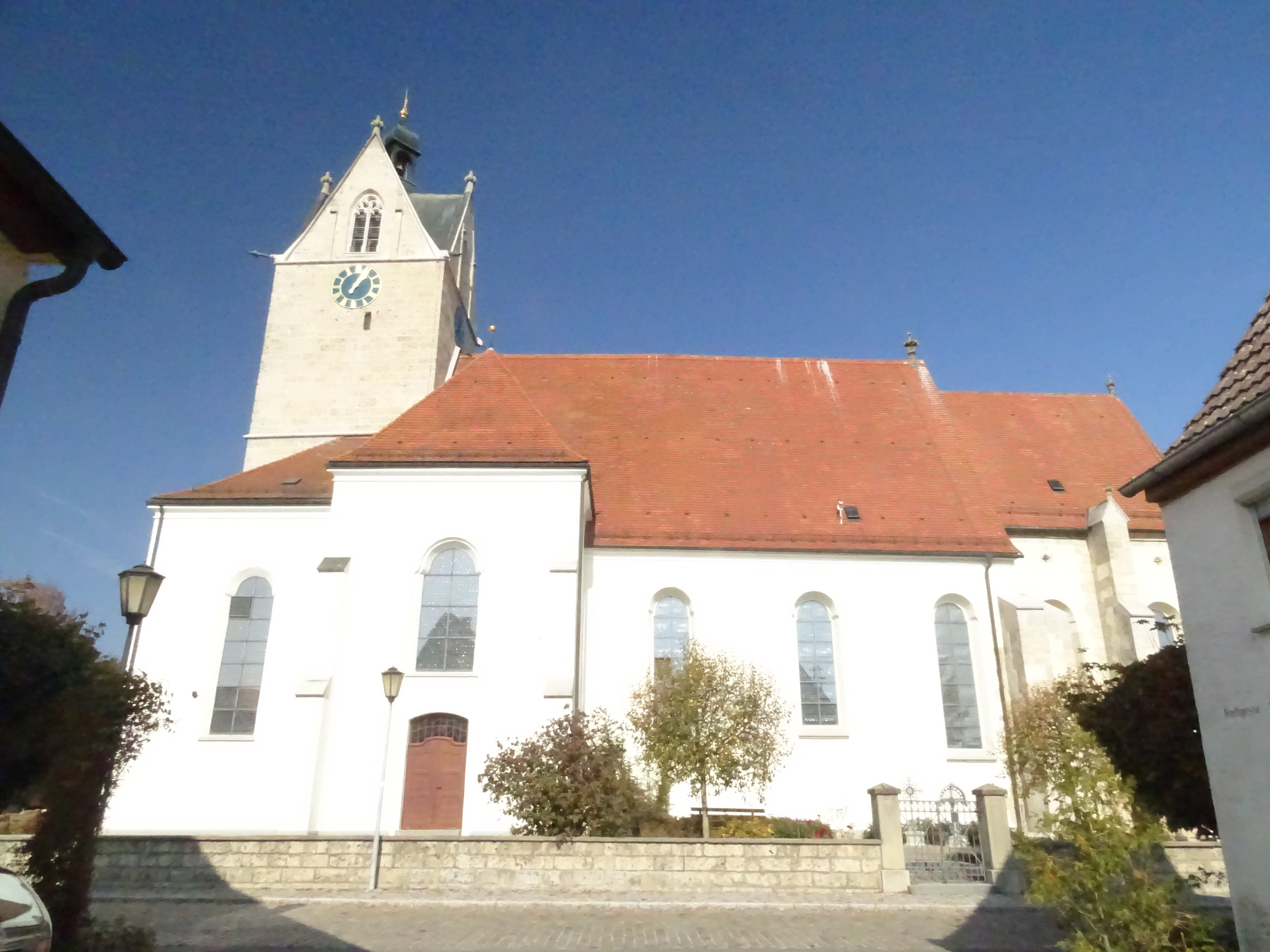
- Catholic parish church, Altheim

- Coat of arms

- Location of Altheim within Biberach district
- Interactive map of Altheim
- Location within Germany Location within Baden-Württemberg
- Coordinates: 48°8′40″N 9°26′54″E
- Country: Germany
- State: Baden-Württemberg
- Admin. region: Tübingen
- District: Biberach

Government
  - Mayor (2024–32): Martin Rude

Area
  - Total: 23.73 km^{2} (9.16 sq mi)
- Elevation: 541 m (1,775 ft)

Population (2025-12-31)
  - Total: 2,159
  - Density: 90.98/km^{2} (235.6/sq mi)
- Time zone: UTC+01:00 (CET)
  - Summer (DST): UTC+02:00 (CEST)
- Postal codes: 88499
- Dialling codes: 07371
- Vehicle registration: BC
- Website: www.gemeinde-altheim.de

Altheim (German pronunciation: [ˈalthaɪm]) is a municipality in the Biberach district of Baden-Württemberg, Germany. It is located between Riedlingen and Langenenslingen.

== History ==
Altheim and the neighboring settlements of Heiligkreuztal, Waldhausen, and Riedlingen became possessions of the House of Habsburg around 1300. With German mediatization, Altheim was in 1806 granted to the Kingdom of Württemberg from the County of Thurn und Taxis. It was assigned to Oberamt Riedlingen and remained under Riedlingen's jurisdiction until 1938, when it was reassigned to Landkreis Saulgau. Altheim began a period of substantial growth after World War II that lasted into the 1980s. In 1973, Altheim was again reassigned by the 1973 Baden-Württemberg district reform to the Biberach district. The town hall, parish church, and rectory, all on the town center, were remodeled in 1986.

== Geography ==
The municipality (Gemeinde) of Altheim covers 2,374 hectares (5,870 acres) of the Biberarch district of the state of Baden-Württemberg, in the Federal Republic of Germany. Altheim is physically located on the left bank of the Danube, on the Iller-Lech Plateau. Elevation above sea level ranges from 529 meters (1,736 ft) Normalnull (NN) on the Danube as it flows into Riedlingen to 652 meters (2,139 ft) NN on top of the Österberg.

The Storchenwiesen Federally-protected nature reserve (Naturschutzgebiet) is located within Altheim's municipal area.

== Coat of arms ==
The municipal coat of arms for Altheim show a beaver, facing right but turned to the left, holding a cartouche topped with a ducal crown, both of gold, containing the Austrian flag in its front paws standing on a grassy shore upon a field divided party per fess into gold and red sections. This pattern was given to Altheim by Leopold I, Holy Roman Emperor, on 21 January 1681. The beaver (German: Biber), paired with the grass and water, is a reference to Altheim's old name, Altheim am Biberach, and the cartouche refers to Biberach's rule by an Austrian vogt.

== Transport ==
Altheim is only connected to nearby villages and to Riedlingen, though it is served by several transit bus lines.

== See also ==
- Altheim culture
