= Stollhof Hoard =

The Stollhof Hoard was found in 1864 in the municipality of Hohe Wand in Lower Austria by a shepherd at the height 700–800 metres (2,300–2,600 ft) above the village of Stollhof. The hoard dates from c. 4000 BC in the Copper Age. The discs are the earliest gold objects to be found in Austria. The hoard consists of:

- 9 spiral rolls with lengths between about 5.6 and 24 centimetres (2.2 and 9.4 in)
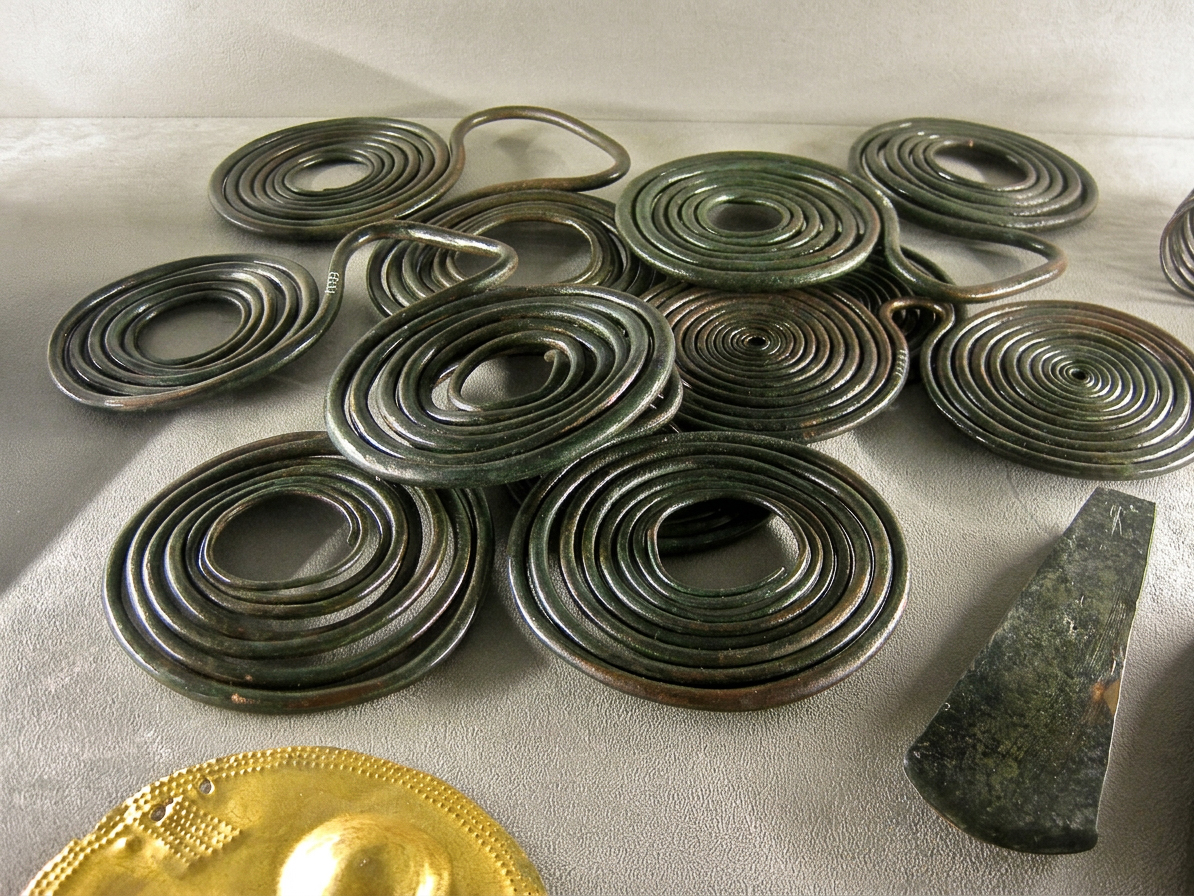
  Chalcolithic hoard of copper and gold objects, c4000Bc from Stollhof in Lower Austria in the Naturhistorische Museum, Vienna
- 6 double spiral pendants made of round wire. Two of them wrapped tightly with a small element loop and four loosely wound with large centre loop. The outer diameters of the coils are from 10.1 to 12.3 centimetres (4.0 to 4.8 in).
- 2 flat axes length of about 14 centimetres (5.5 in) and 16.5 centimetres (6.5 in)
- 2 spiral bracelets (9.5 centimetres [3.7 in] and 10 centimetres [3.9 in] whorls) section 5.0 and 5.5 centimetres (2.0 and 2.2 in), length 7.0 and 7.5 centimetres (2.8 and 3.0 in)
- 2 gold discs diameter 10.6 and 13.8 centimetres (4.2 and 5.4 in), weight 71 and 121 grams (2.5 and 4.3 oz)
- 1 eberzahnförmiges Zierblech length 15.2 centimetres (6.0 in).
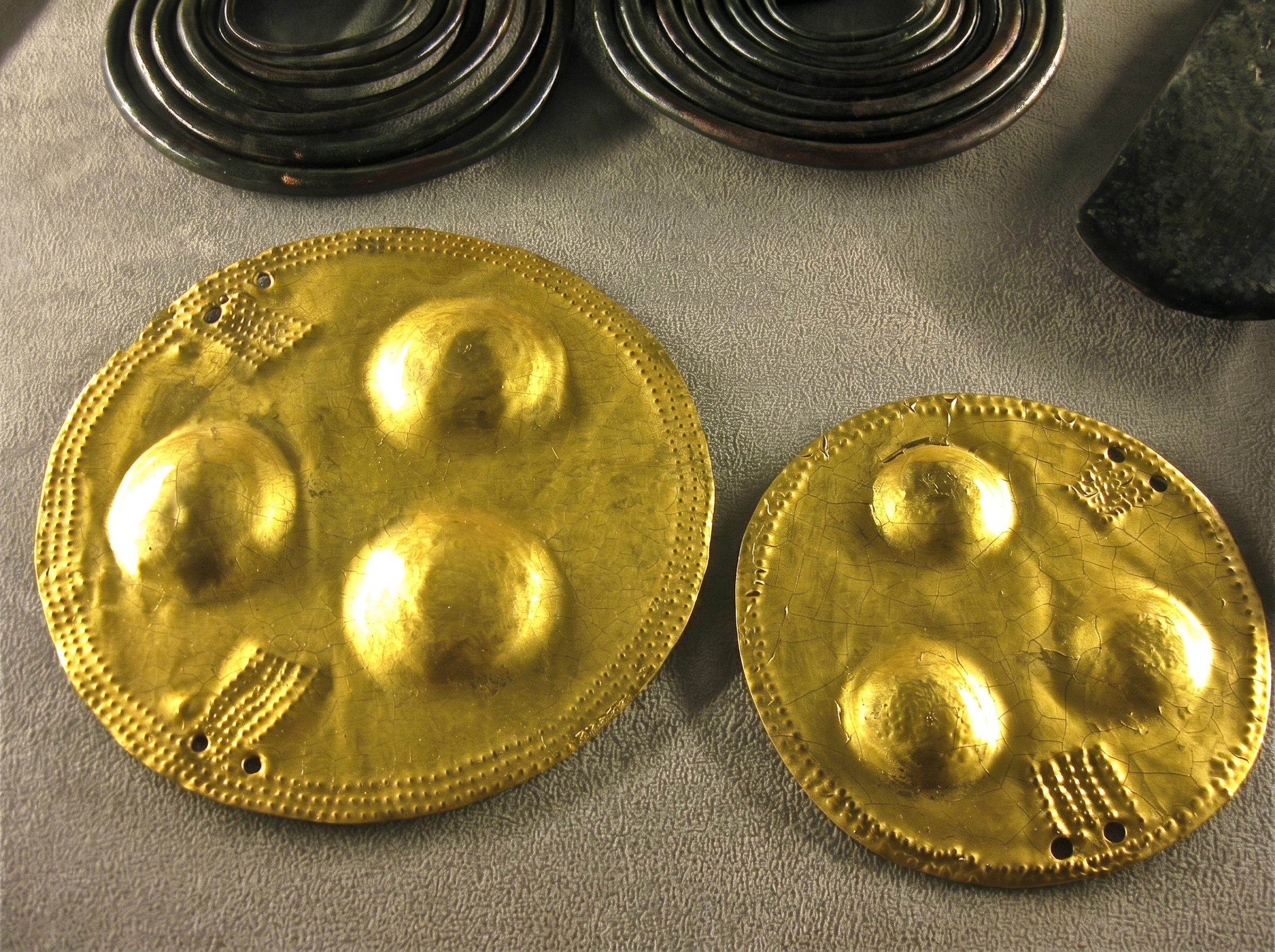
  Gold discs, c4000Bc from Stollhof in Lower Austria in the Naturhistorische Museum, Vienna

The gold discs are decorated with repousse ornament and were attached to clothing by a thread through the small holes.. To the discs have parallels from Brześć Kujawski and Jordansmühl in Poland (where they occur with other finds) and at Zalaszentgrót (Csáford, Hungary)

One of the axes belongs to P. Patay's Szakálhát type, which is typical of the Bodrogkeresztúr culture.

Some of the finds from the hoard never reached Naturhistorische Museum in Vienna, where the hoard is on display.

== See also ==
- Old Europe (archaeology)
