= Francesco Menotti =

Wetland archaeologist

Francesco Menotti is an archaeologist. His main interest in research in wetland settlements (wetland archaeology). His positions include Anniversary Chair of Archaeology at the School of Archaeological Sciences, University of Bradford, UK, since 2014. Before that he was SNF Professor of Archaeology at Basel University.

== Books ==
- 1998: The Inkas: Last Stage of Stone Masonry Development in the Andes
  "This book examines Inka stone masonry, a major hallmark of their culture, tracing the process from extraction through dressing techniques to stone-block transport and use."
- 2001: ‘The missing period’: Middle Bronze Age lake-dwellings in the Alps
  "This study focuses on the alternating phases of occupation and abandonment of lake-dwellings within the Alpine region, in particular on Lake Constance and Lake Zurich"
- 2004: Living on the lake in prehistoric Europe (editor)
  "This definitive volume provides an overview of the development of lake village studies, explores the impact of a range of scientific techniques on the settlements and considers how the public can relate to this evocative and exciting branch of archaeology"
- 2012: Wetland Archaeology and Beyond: Theory and Practice
- 2013 The Oxford Handbook of Wetland Archaeology (Francesco Menotti, Aidan O'Sullivan, editors)
  A survey of wetland archaeology

== Recognition ==
- 2016: Ben Cullen prize by the Antiquity journal (shared with Benjamin Jennings and Hartmut Gollnisch-Moos) for the article "‘Gifts for the gods’: lake-dwellers' macabre remedies against floods in the Central European Bronze Age"
