= Aghios Epiktitos Vrysi =

Archaeological site in Cyprus

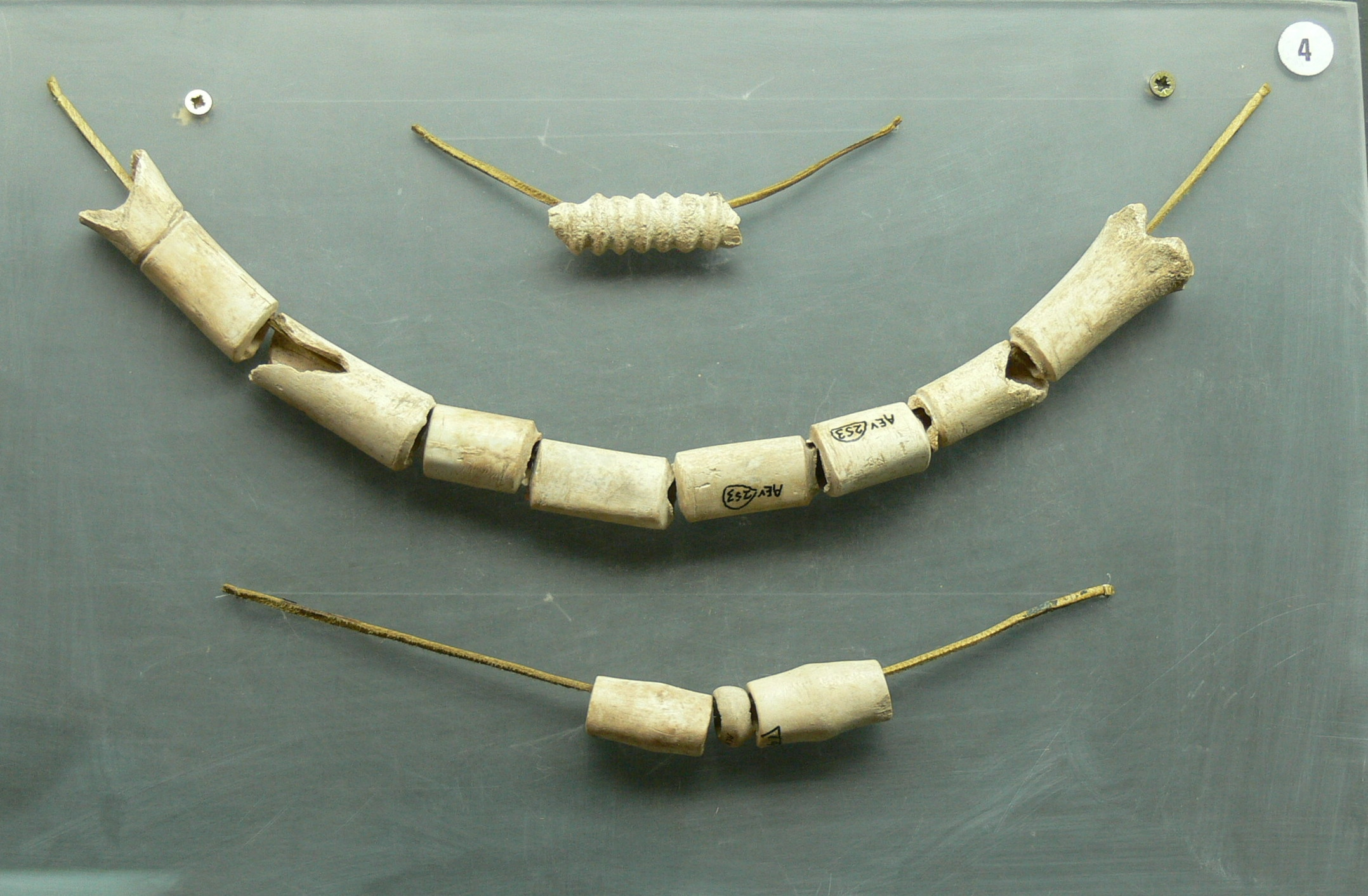
Bone Beads, Kyrenia Archaeological Museum

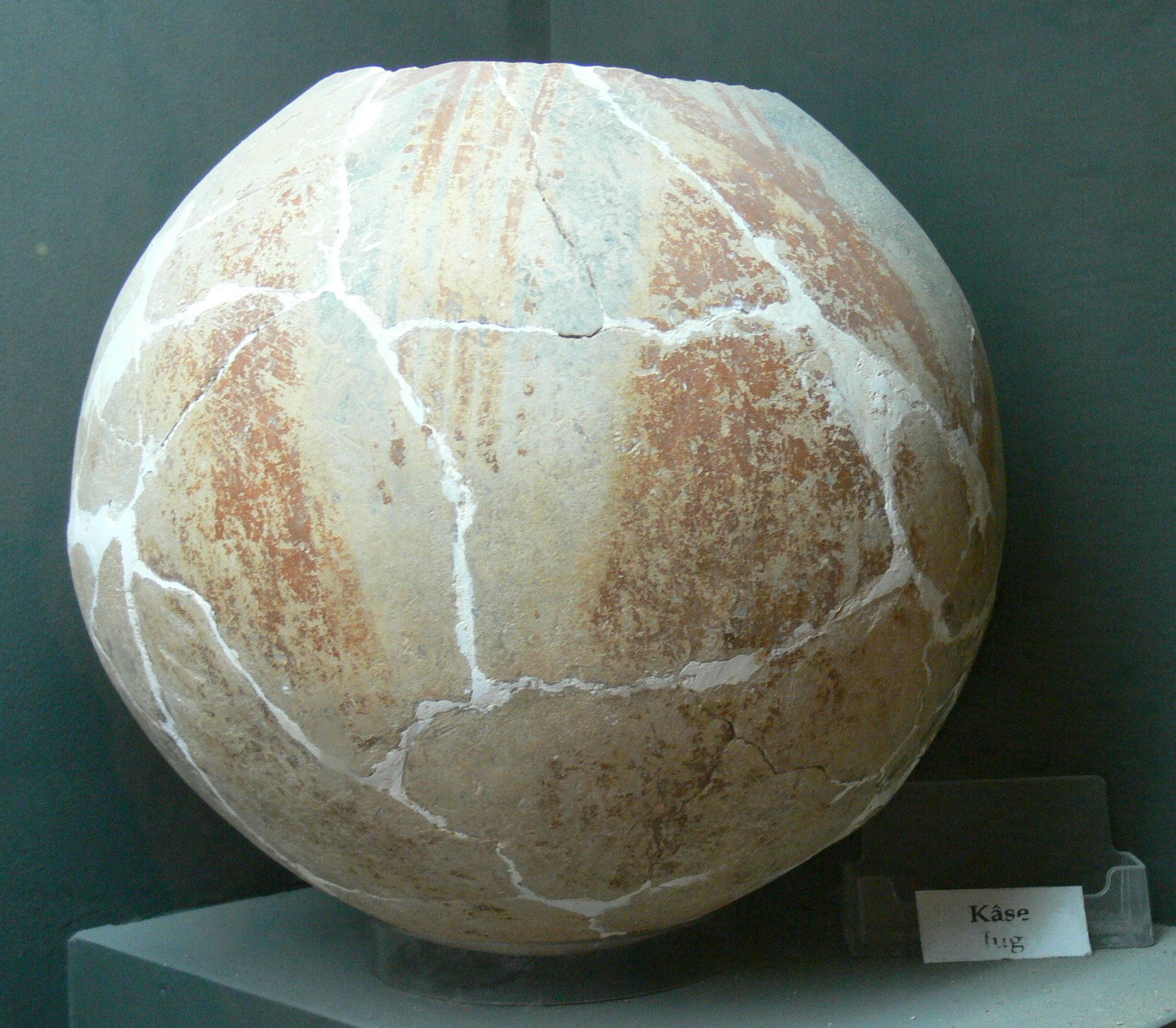
Ceramic jug

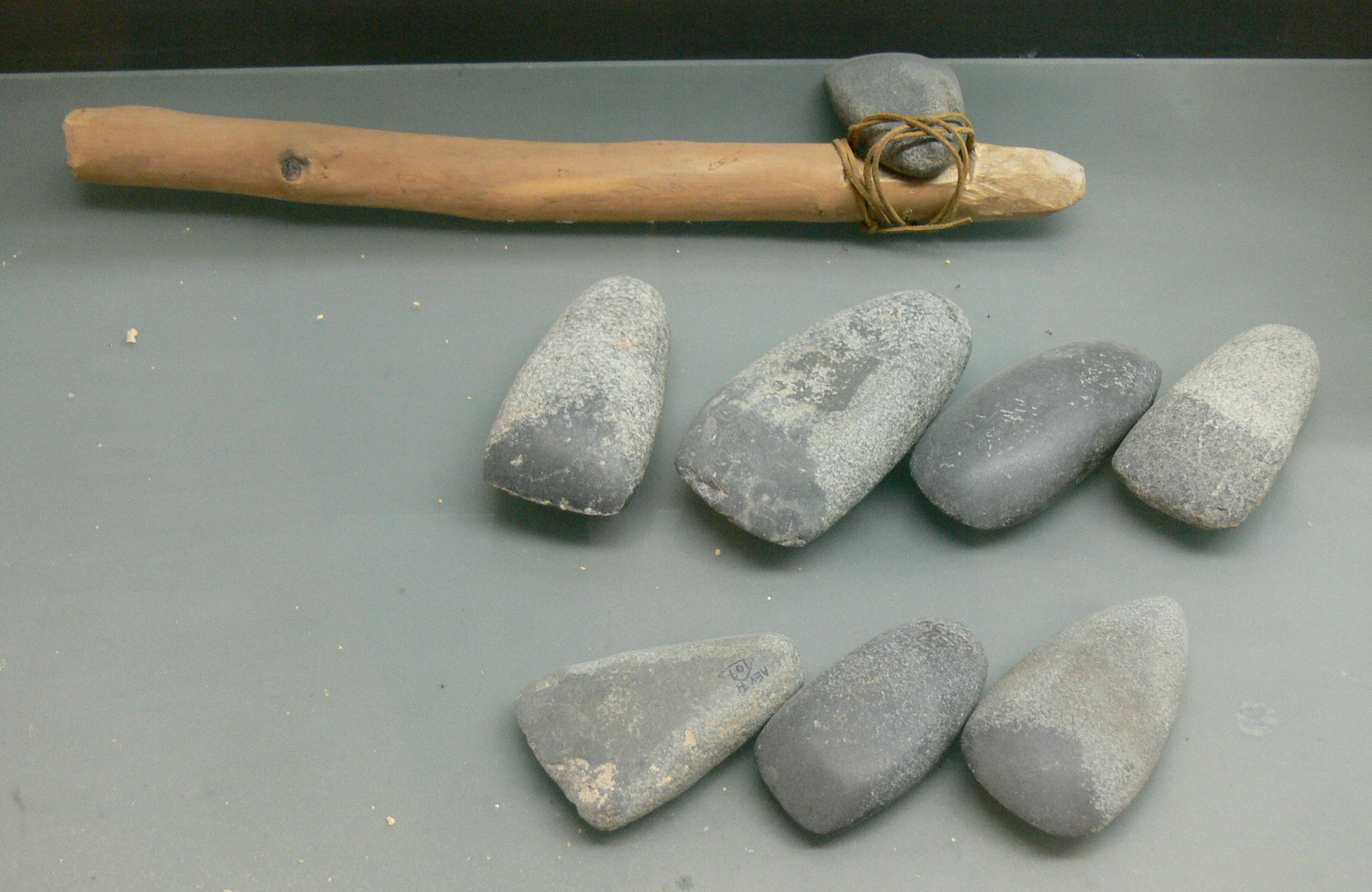
stone axes, ibid

Aghios Epiktitos Vrysi (also Ayios Epiktitos Vrysi, often shortened to Vrysi ), is an archaeological site in Cyprus that is located 9 km east of Kyrenia on a 9 to 10 m high cliff. This site was discovered between 3800 and 4400 BC and is the Ceramic Neolithic of the island. The site consists of at least 15 houses on an area of over 600 m^{2}, with undercutting and subsequent demolitions that have continuously reduced the area. At the beginning, the size of the site was estimated to be more than half a hectare . In 1969-1973, Edgar J. Peltenburg was the head of the mining that was carried out there.

During the mining, some builders drove their dwellings down to a depth of 7 m, so that circular pits were created in the site, which had an average area of 14 m^{2}. Very similar to those of Sotira. They placed fireplaces and raised berths, benches, and seats on the walls and places created. The same tasks were apparently performed over and over again. The village created was practically invisible from the sea and had a 5-meter-high wall, which separated the ledge from the coastal plain, and was covered by a ditch up to 7 m wide and 4.5 m deep.

The interior was accessed via a thatched roof, whereby the rooms became more and more spacious over time, and they increased to 3 m above ground and had 60 cm thick outer walls. On average, the rooms were 2.00 to 2.70 m high. The narrow paths between the rooms were paved with gravels.

The people there lived from the division of labor and built their own craftsmen's houses. The basis of the economy was hunting for mammals, turtles, fish, and birds, and the agriculture and livestock was farming (sheep, pigs, goats, dogs, cats), but also handicrafts. The nearby plain offered olive groves and allowed the establishment of wheat, barley, and oat fields. Wine was also cultivated. The unusual density of the sheep and goat population as well as a considerable number of different awls and needles testify to a developed textile processing, the products of which were apparently traded and bartered outside the village.

Obsidian was evidently still in use, but, unlike in earlier times, it had become extremely rare in Cyprus. Only one piece was found in Vrysi.

Since no graves were found within the site, it is assumed that the dead were buried in pits outside the village, similar to the one in Sotira.

Vrysi plays a certain role in the history of Cyprus, as the temporal boundary between the ceramic and ceramic Neolithic has been discussed for a long time. While in one model the time limit is seen at 5129 ± 77 cal BC, the other extreme model sees this limit at 4524 ± 109. Only four finds speak for an earlier point in time (2013). Two of the only four pieces come from Vrysi, and they date from the early 5th millennium. Of the two older finds, one has been incorrectly dated, the other comes from Kandou Kofovounos. Overall, the first half millennium of the ceramic Neolithic remains documented very poorly, so that the impression of a huge gap remains.

== Literature ==
- George RH Wright: Ancient Building in Cyprus, Part 1, Brill, Leiden 1988, pp. 45–46.
- Edgar J. Peltenburg : Vrysi. A Subterranean Settlement on Cyprus, Warminster 1982.
