= Tell Moutasaalem =

Archaeological site in Syria

- Type: tell
- Periods: Pottery Neolithic
- Location: Hasakah Governorate, Syria
- Region: Upper Mesopotamia

Tell Moutasaalem is a tell (or archaeological settlement mound) in the Khabur River Valley in northern Syria dated by pottery finds to the latter Neolithic era. Middle Paleolithic flint artefacts have been recovered from this site as well. Given that tell sites are not considered to have been occupied in the Middle Paleolithic, it is thought that these artefacts were brought to the site at a later stage, either by humans or natural processes. The site was recorded during an archaeological survey of the Upper Khabur area in 1990–1.
