= Langweiler =

Langweiler may refer to:

- Langweiler (archaeological site), a former village and archaeological site near Aldenhoven, Germany
- Langweiler, Birkenfeld, a municipality in the district of Birkenfeld, Rhineland-Palatinate, Germany
- Langweiler, Kusel, a municipality in the district of Kusel, Rhineland-Palatinate, Germany
