= Late Neolithic =

Later part of the Neolithic period in Southwest Asia

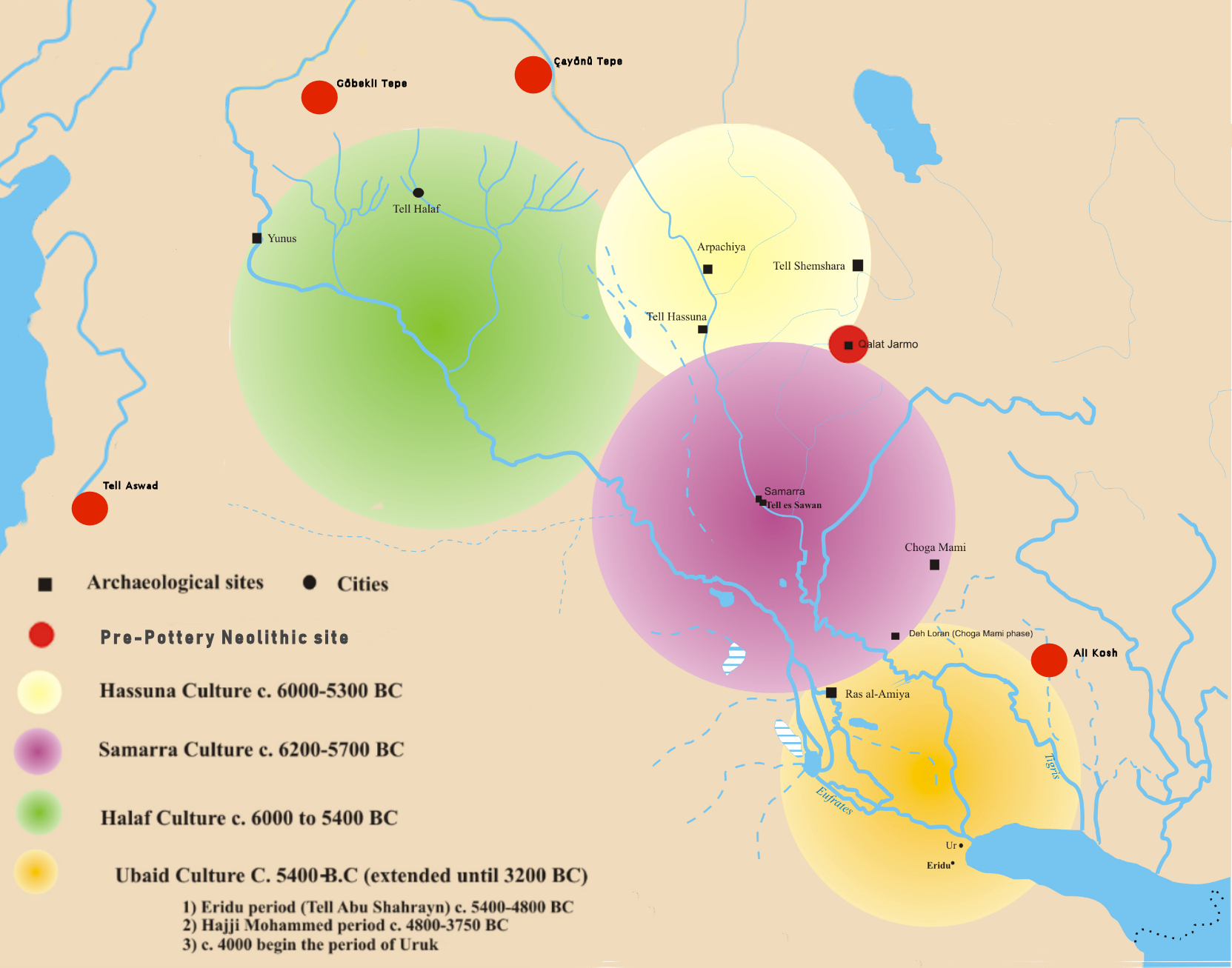
- After the initial Pre-Pottery Neolithic phase from northwestern Mesopotamia to Jarmo (red dots, circa 7500 BCE), the Pottery Neolithic culture of Mesopotamia in the 7th–5th millennium BCE was centered around the Hassuna culture in the north, the Halaf culture in the northwest, the Samarra culture in central Mesopotamia and the Ubaid culture in the southeast, which later expanded to encompass the whole region.
- Geographical range: Old World
- Period: Neolithic in the Near East
- Dates: c. 6,400–3,500 BCE
- Preceded by: Pre-Pottery Neolithic B
- Followed by: Bronze Age

Prehistoric Southwest Asia
Axis scale is years Before Present

In the archaeology of Southwest Asia, the Late Neolithic, also known as the Ceramic Neolithic or Pottery Neolithic, is the final part of the Neolithic in the Near East, following on from the Pre-Pottery Neolithic and preceding the Chalcolithic. It is sometimes further divided into Pottery Neolithic A (PNA) and Pottery Neolithic B (PNB) phases.

The Late Neolithic began with the first experiments with pottery, around 7000 BCE, and lasted until the discovery of copper metallurgy and the start of the Chalcolithic around 4500 BCE.

== Southern Levant ==
The Neolithic of the Southern Levant is divided into Pre-Pottery and Pottery or Late Neolithic phases, initially based on the sequence established by Kathleen Kenyon at Jericho. In the Mediterranean zone, the Pottery Neolithic is further subdivided into two subphases and several regional cultures. However, the extent to which these represent real cultural phenomena is debated:

- Pottery Neolithic A (PNA) or Late Neolithic 1 (LN1)
  - Yarmukian culture
  - Lodian (Jericho IX) culture
- Pottery Neolithic B (PNB) or Late Neolithic 2 (LN2)
  - Wadi Rabah culture

In the eastern desert regions of the Southern Levant—the Badia—the whole period is referred to as the Late Neolithic (c. 7000–5000 BCE). It is marked by the appearance of the first pastoralist societies in the desert, who may have migrated there following the abandonment of the large PPNB settlements to the west.

In the southern Negev and Sinai Deserts, the Late Neolithic is characterised by the pastoralist Timnian culture, which persisted through to the Bronze Age.

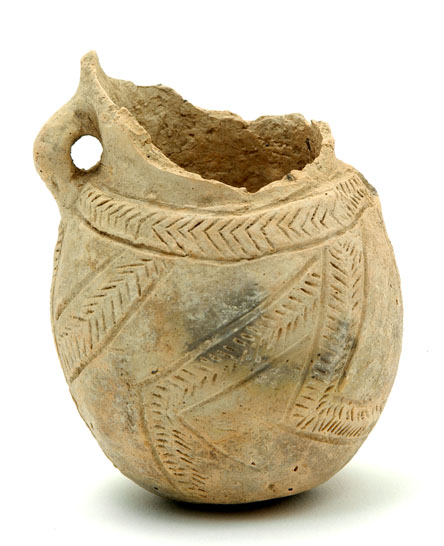
Yarmukian pottery vessel, Sha'ar HaGolan.

== Mesopotamia ==
The Late Neolithic began around 6,400 BCE in the Fertile Crescent, succeeding the period of the Pre-Pottery Neolithic. By then distinctive cultures emerged, with pottery like the Halafian (Turkey, Syria, Northern Mesopotamia) and Ubaid (Southern Mesopotamia).

=== First experiments with pottery (c. 7000 BCE) ===
The northern Mesopotamian sites of Tell Hassuna and Jarmo are some of the oldest sites in the Near-East where pottery has been found, appearing in the most recent levels of excavation, which dates it to the 7th millennium BCE. This pottery is handmade, of simple design and with thick sides, and treated with a vegetable solvent. There are clay figures, zoomorphic or anthropomorphic, including figures of pregnant women which are taken to be fertility goddesses, similar to the Mother Goddess of later Neolithic cultures in the same region.

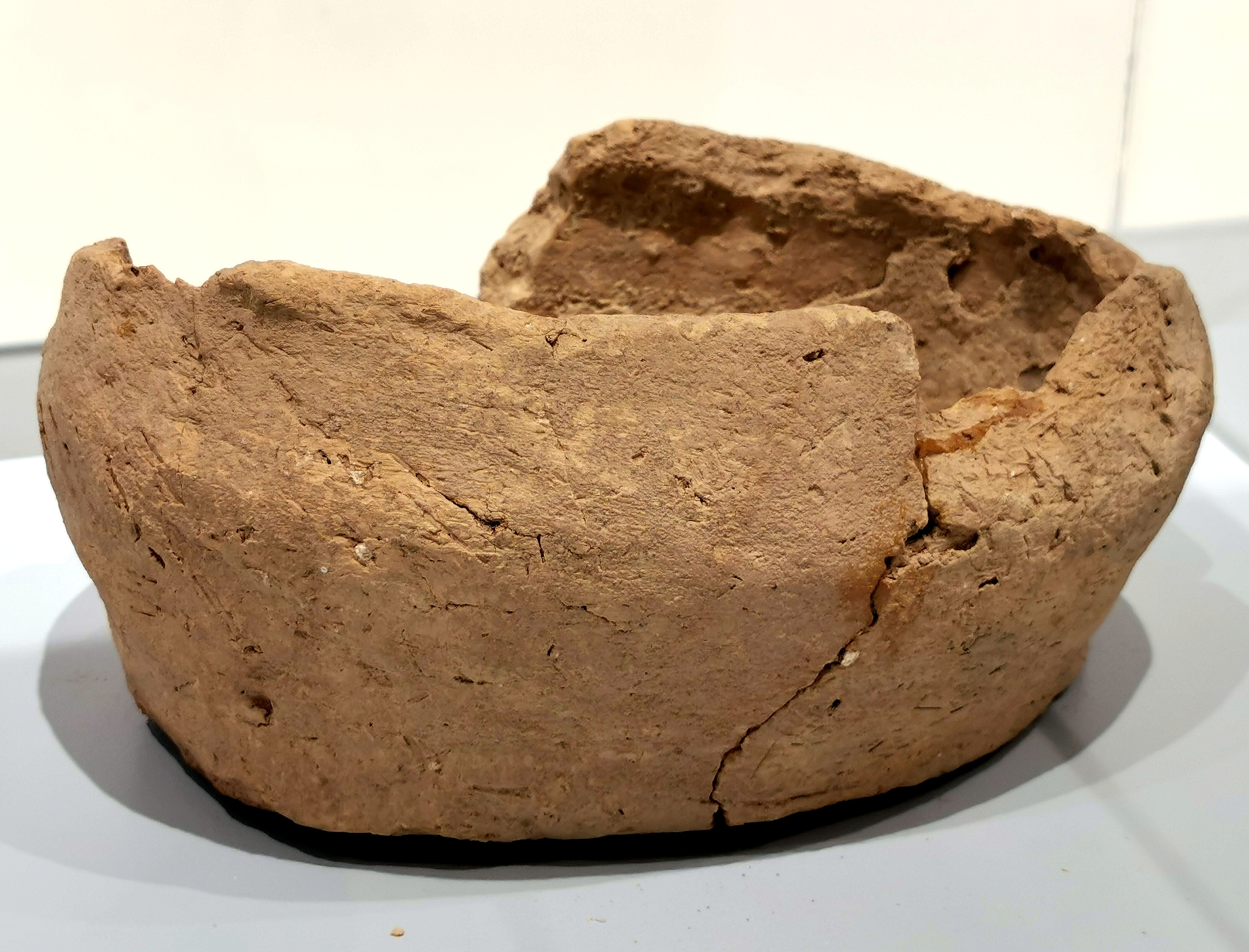
Pottery bowl from Jarmo, Mesopotamia, 7100-5800 BCE.

=== Halaf culture (6000–5000 BCE) ===
Pottery was decorated with abstract geometric patterns and ornaments, especially in the Halaf culture, also known for its clay fertility figurines, painted with lines. Clay was all around and the main material; often modelled figures were painted with black decoration. Carefully crafted and dyed pots, especially jugs and bowls, were traded. As dyes, iron oxide containing clays were diluted in different degrees or various minerals were mixed to produce different colours.

The Halaf culture saw the earliest known appearance of stamp seals. They featured essentially geometric patterns.

Female fertility figurines in painted clay, possibly goddesses, also appear in this period, circa 6000–5100 BCE.

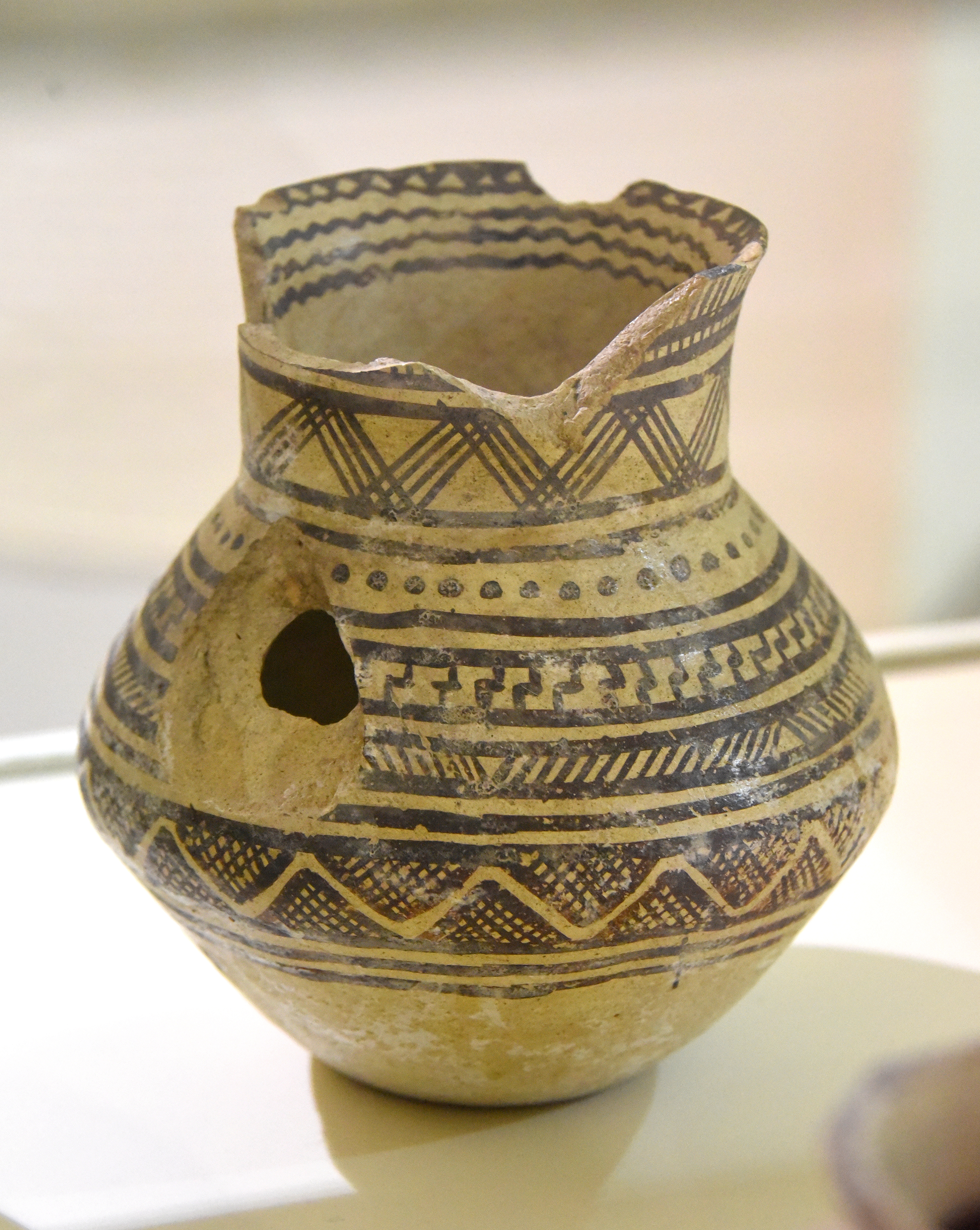
Jar decorated with diverse geometric patterns; 4900-4300 BC; ceramic; by Halaf culture; Erbil Civilization Museum (Erbil, Iraq)

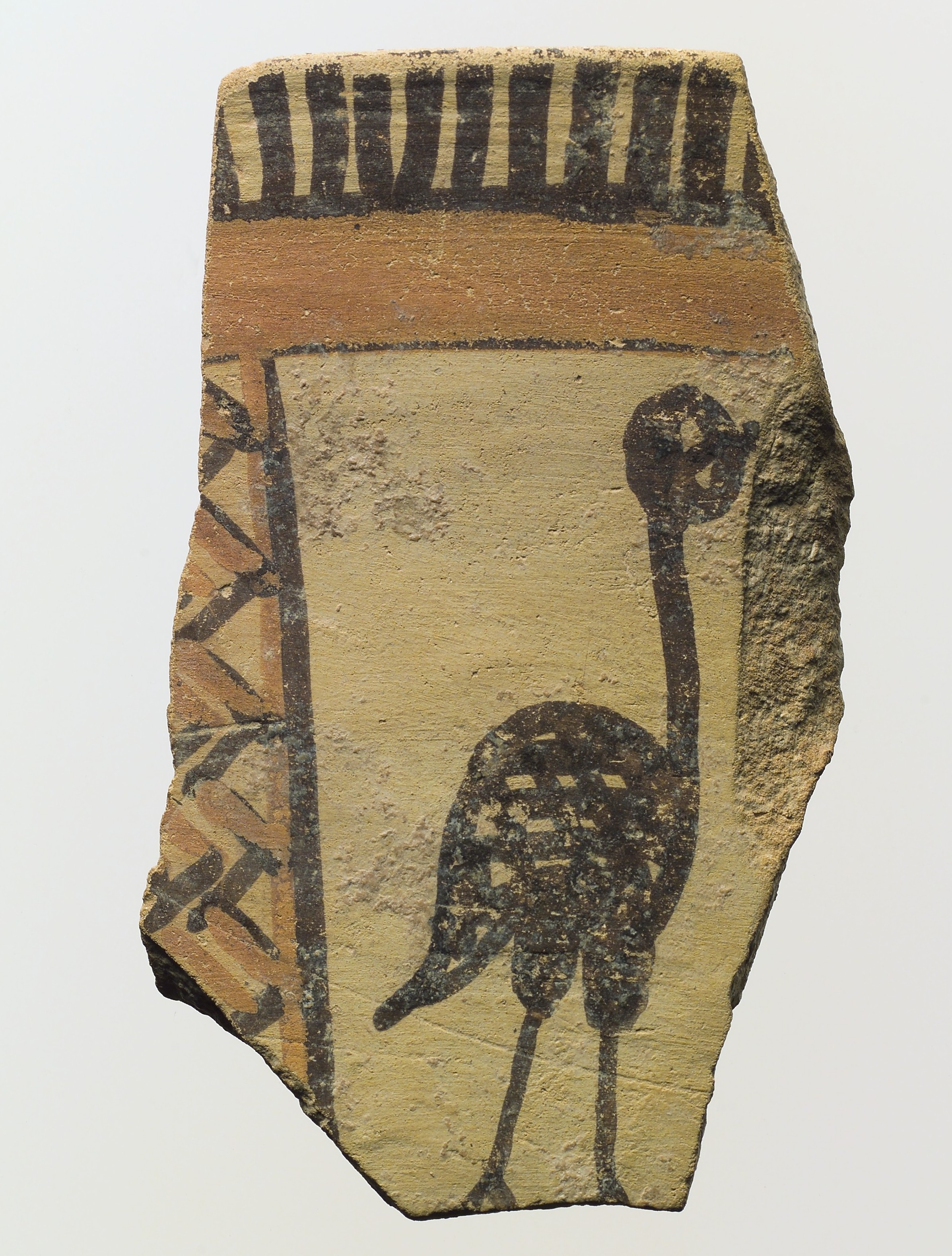
Shard; 5600-5000 BC; painted ceramic; 7.19 × 4.19 cm; by Halaf culture

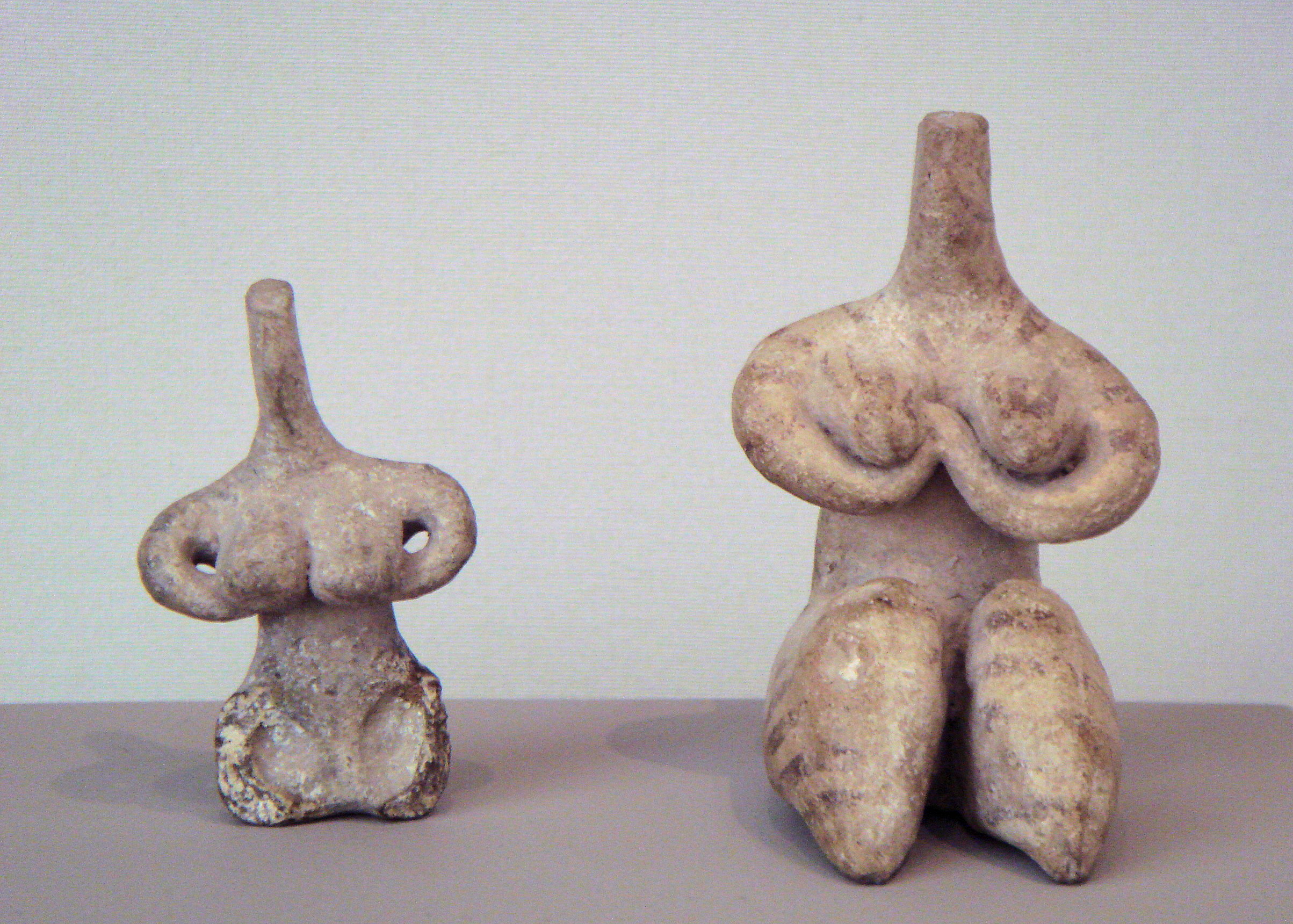
Halaf culture female figurines, 6000-5100 BC Louvre Museum

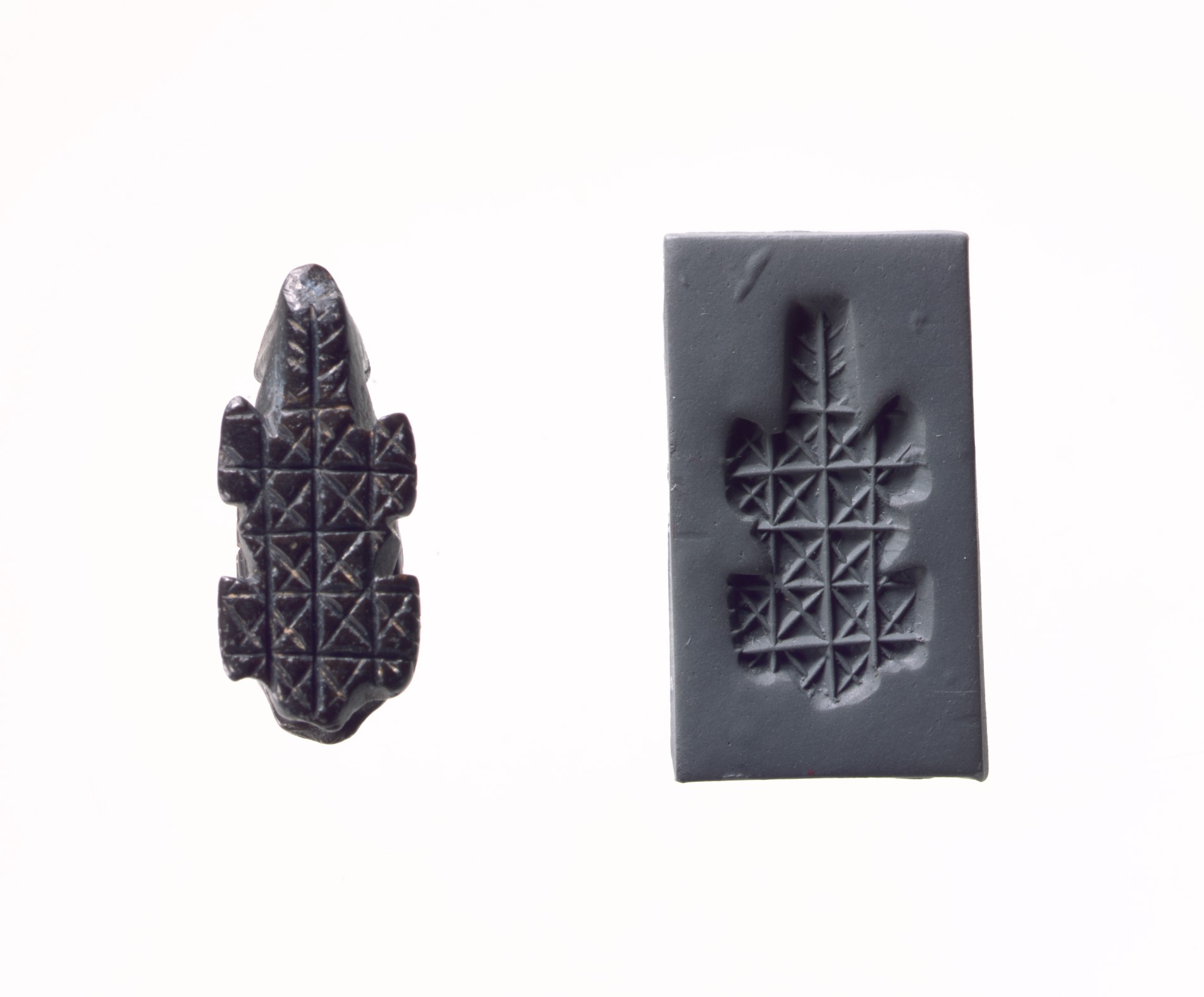
Stamp seal and modern impression- geometric pattern. Halaf culture

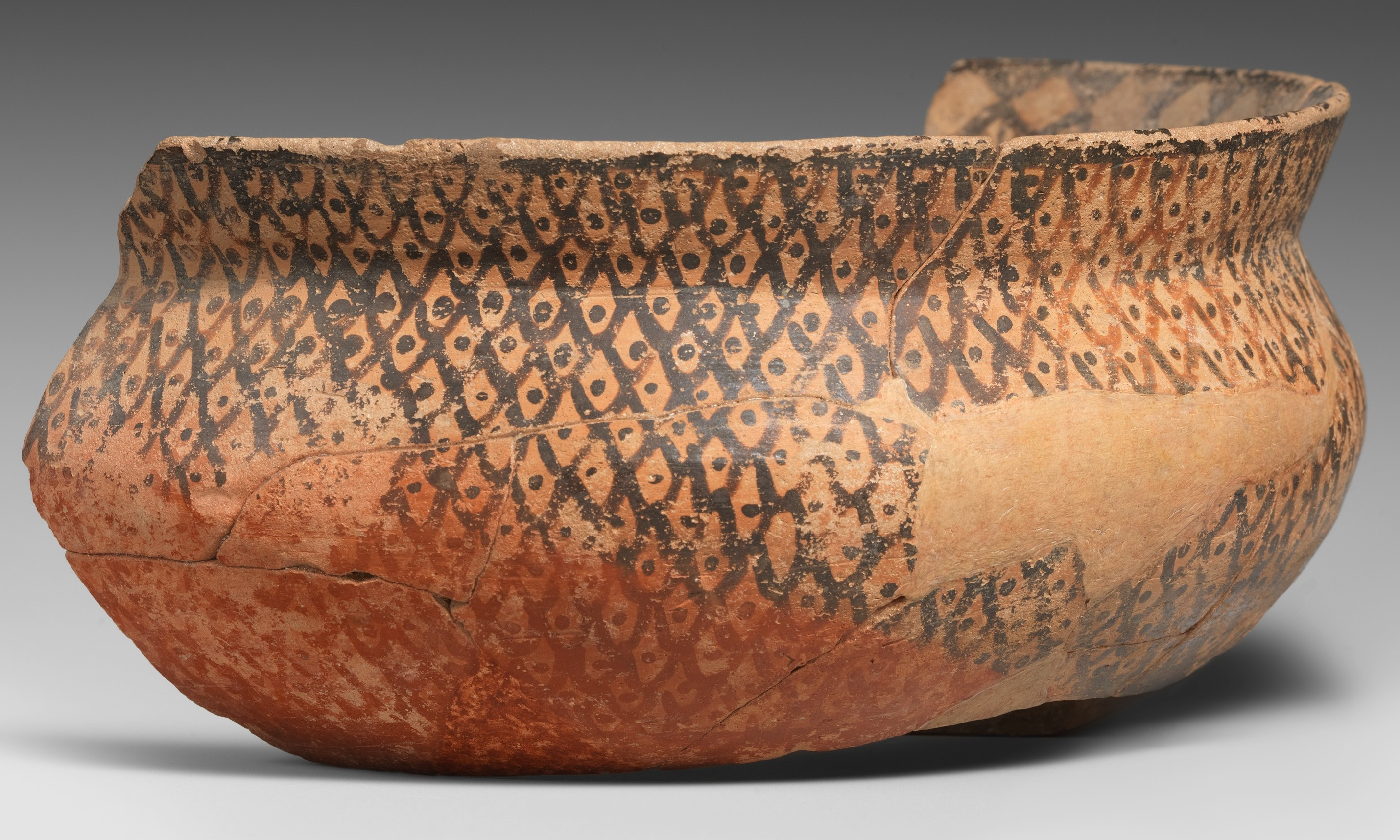
Fragment of a bowl; 5600-5000 BC; 8.2 cm; by Halaf culture

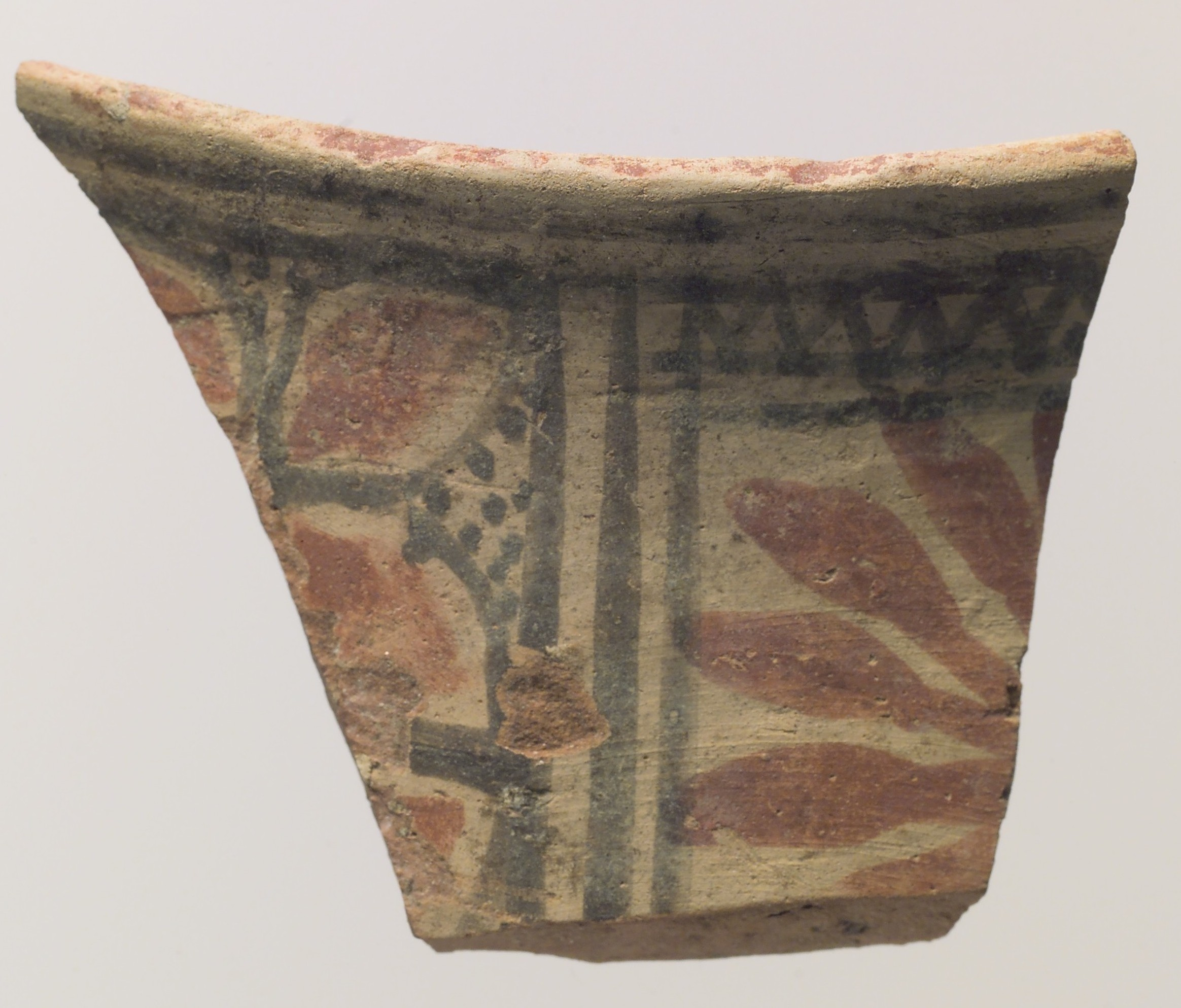
Shard; 5600-5000 BC; painted ceramic; 3.96 × 5.21 cm; by Halaf culture

=== Hassuna culture (6000–5000 BCE) ===
The Hassuna culture is a Neolithic archaeological culture in northern Mesopotamia dating to the early sixth millennium BCE. It is named after the type site of Tell Hassuna in Iraq. Other sites where Hassuna material has been found include Tell Shemshara. The decoration of pottery essentially consists in geometrical shapes, and a few ibex designs. The monochrome pottery from the latest level at Ginnig has been described as "proto-Hassuna". As the oldest layers at the site lacked pottery, Ginnig may represent a rare example of site in Upper Mesopotamia that was occupied during the transition from the aceramic to the ceramic Neolithic.

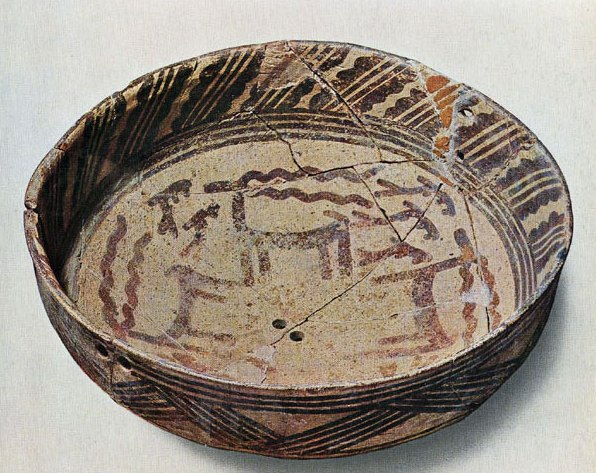
Hassuna redware bowl, circa 5500 BCE

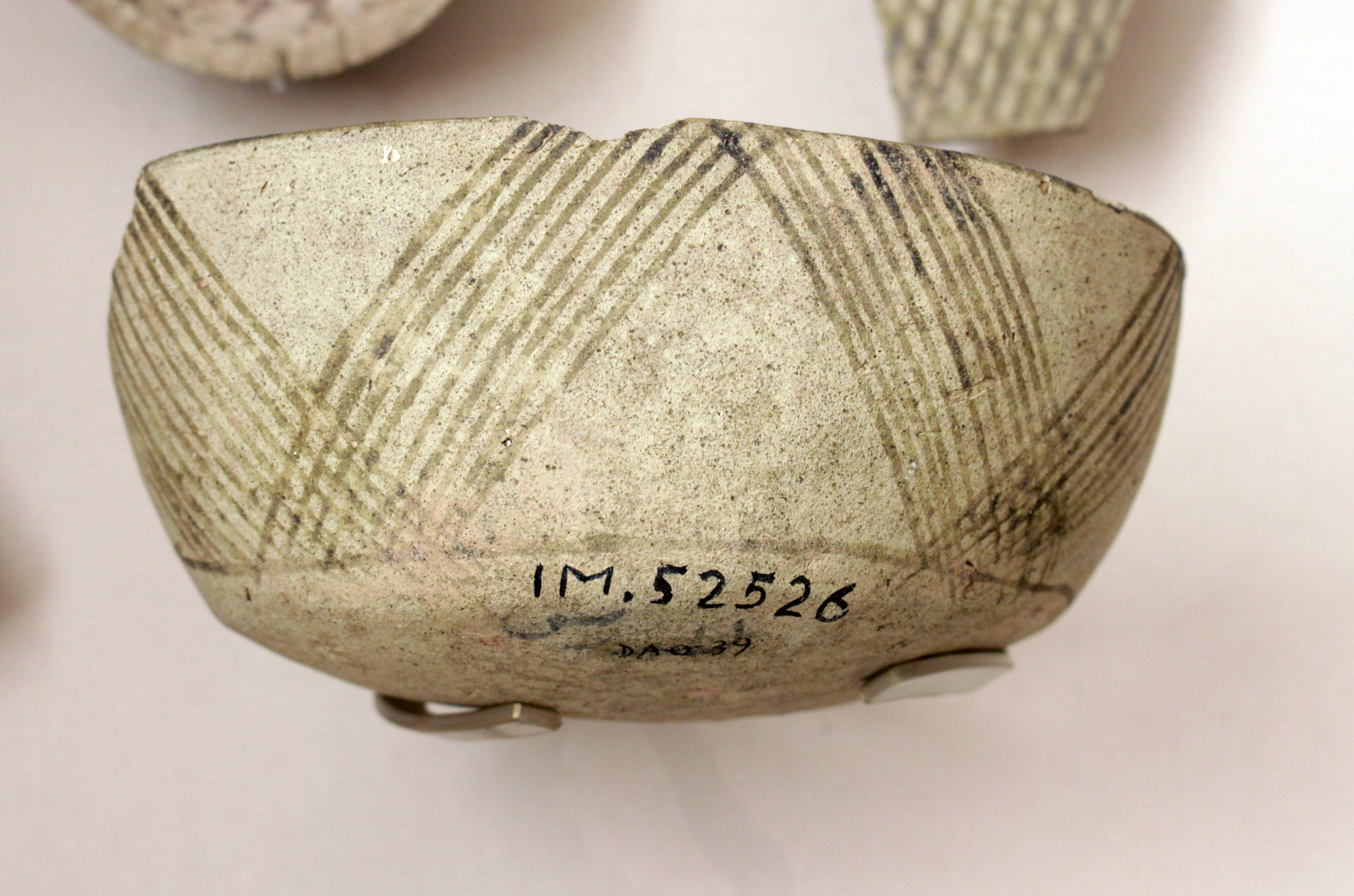
Fragment of pottery with incised and painted decor. From Tell Hassuna, 6500 - 6000 BCE.

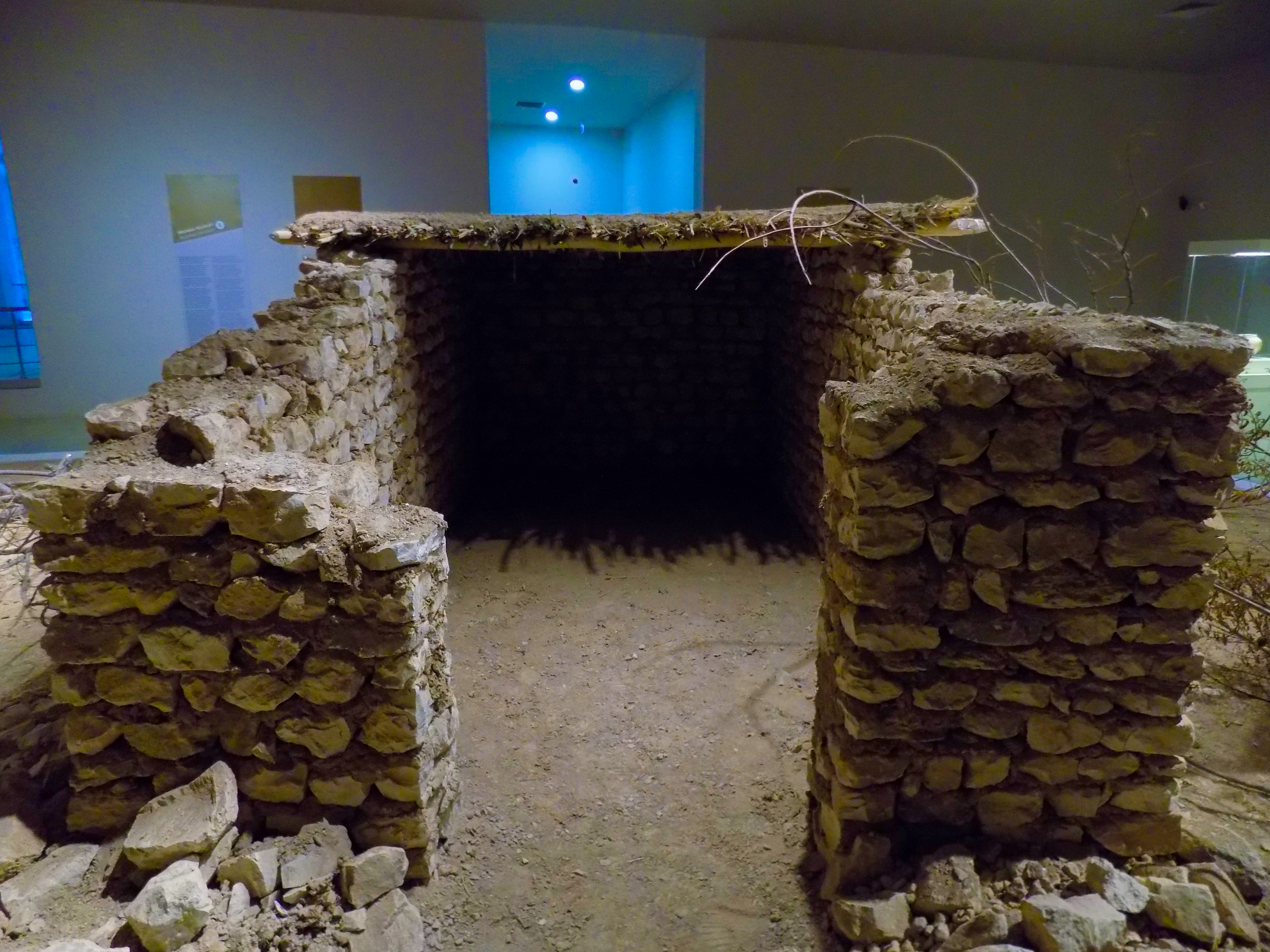
Reconstitution of Neolithic dwelling in northern Mesopotamia (Akarcay Tepe II)

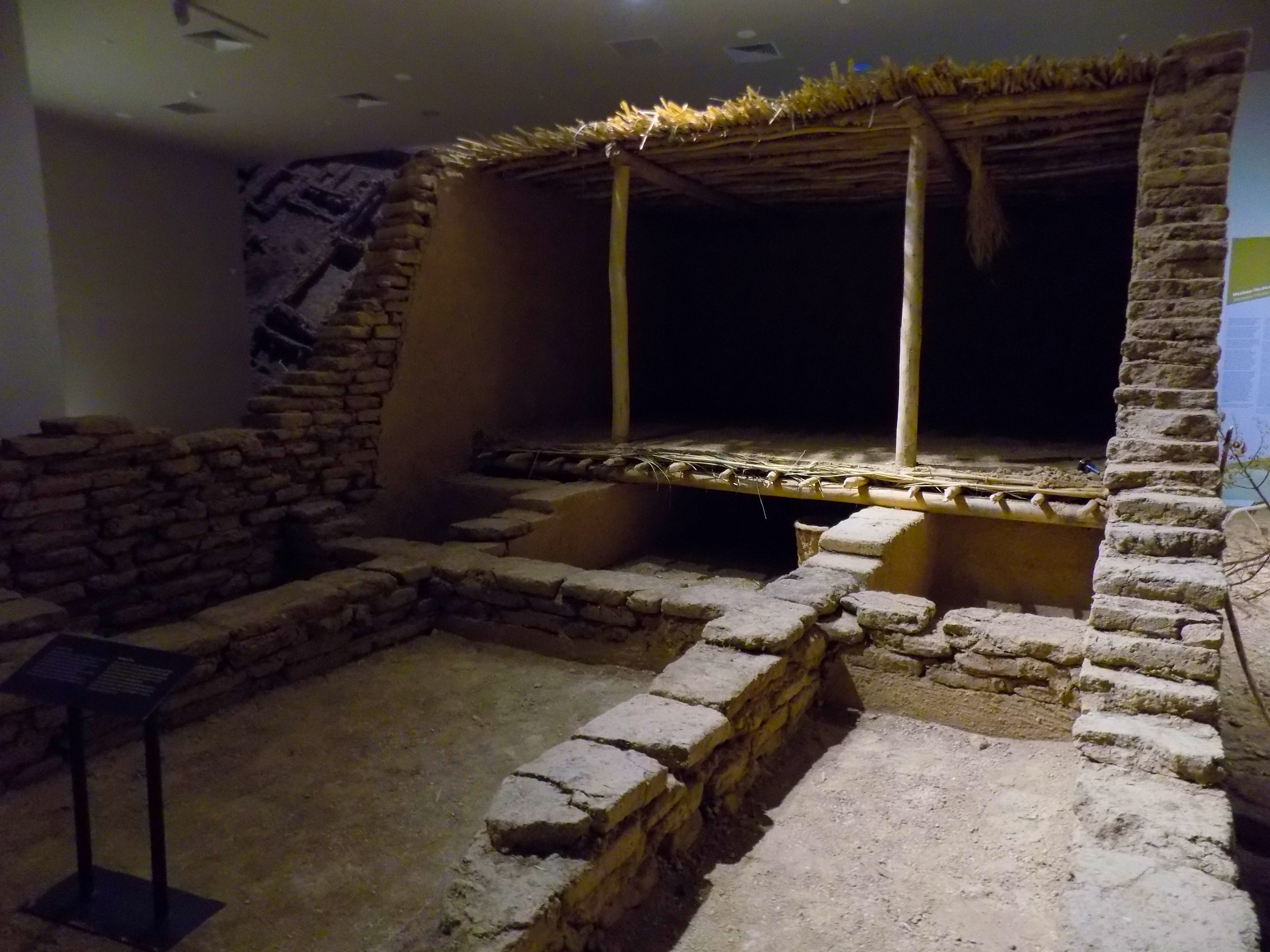
Reconstitution of Neolithic dwelling in northern Mesopotamia (Akarcay Tepe II)

=== Samarra culture (6000–4800 BCE) ===
The Samarra culture is a Chalcolithic archaeological culture in northern Mesopotamia that is roughly dated to 5500–4800 BCE. It partially overlaps with the Hassuna and early Ubaid.

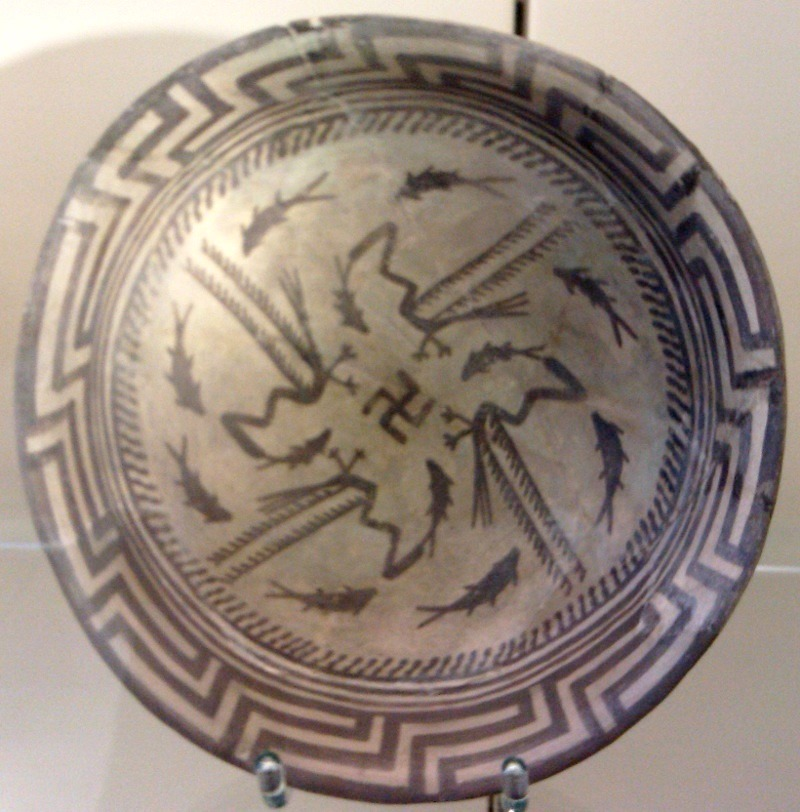
Samarra plate, with a design consists of a rim, a circle of eight fish, and four fish swimming towards the center being caught by four birds, at the center being a swastika symbol; circa 4000 BCE; painted ceramic; diameter: 27.7 cm; Vorderasiatisches Museum (Berlin)

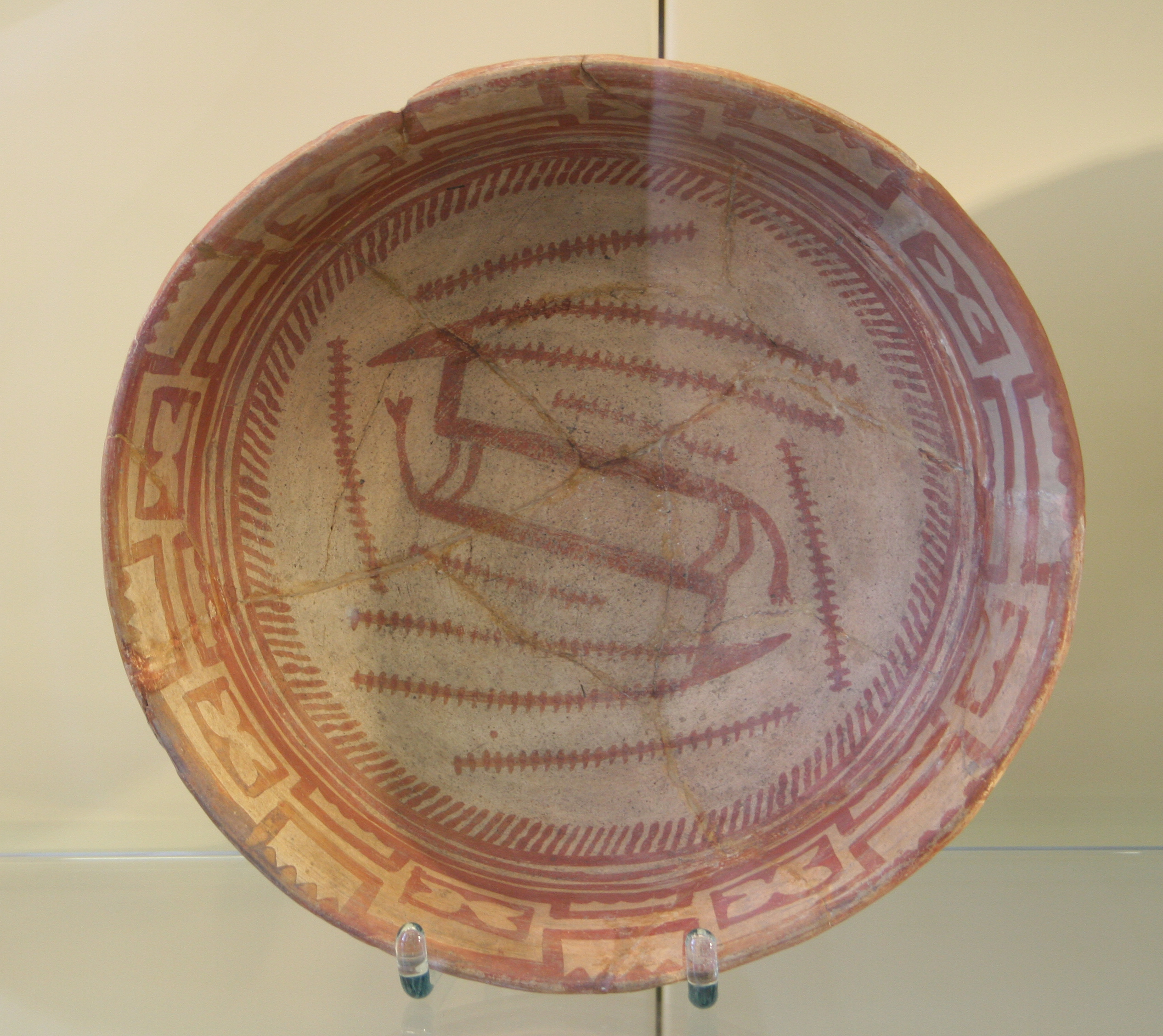
Samarra period fine ware, with central Ibex motif; circa 6200-5700 BCE; Vorderasiatisches Museum

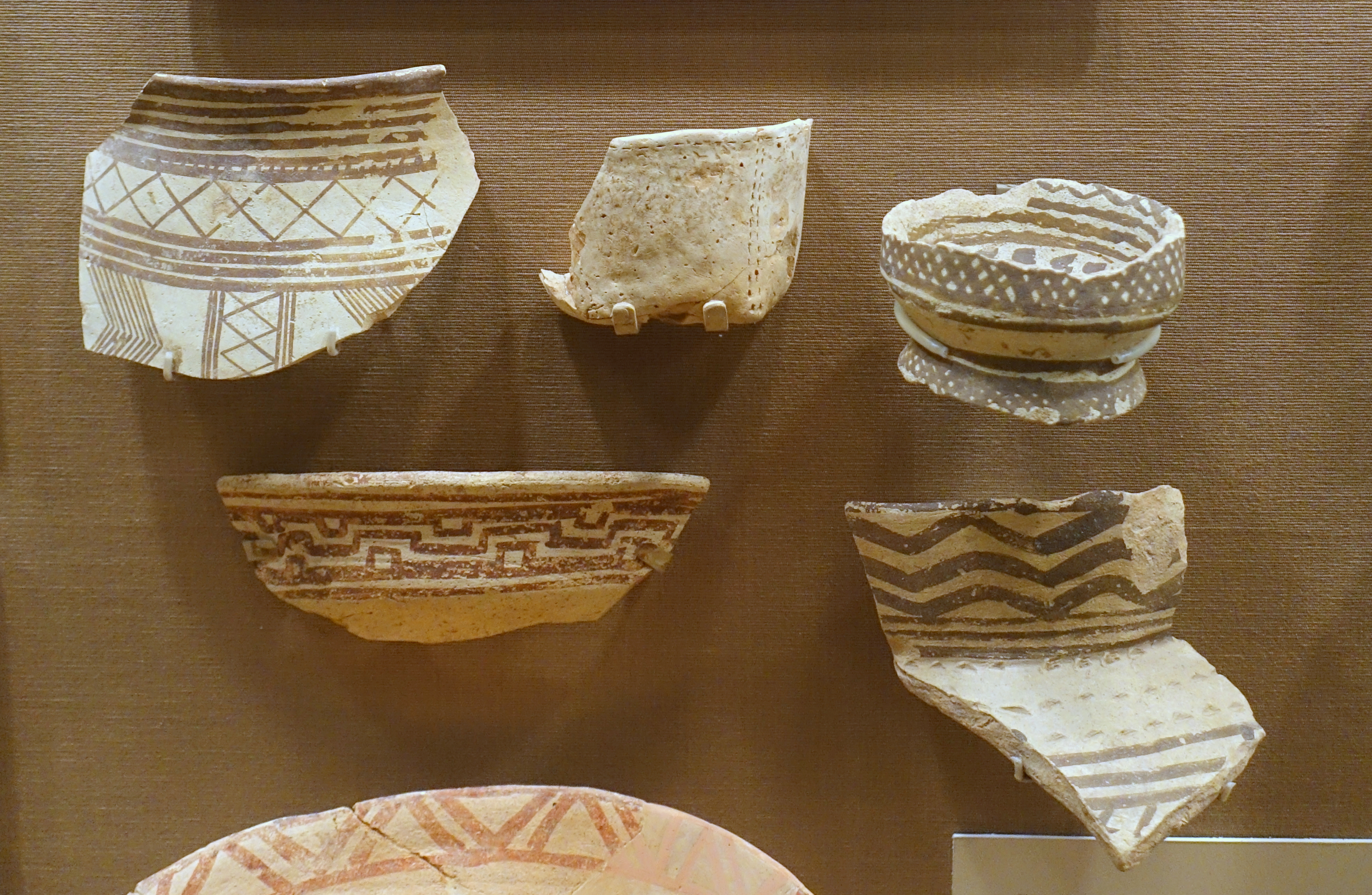
Fragment of Samarra pottery with geometrical designs in University of Chicago Oriental Institute (USA)

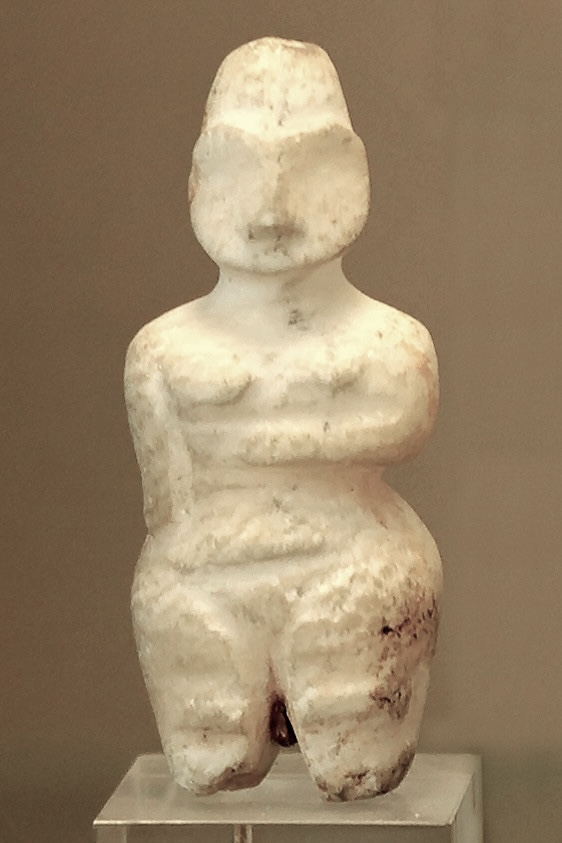
Female figurine found in the Tell es Sawwan (middle Tigris, near Samarra), level 1, ca. 6000 BCE.

=== Ubaid culture (6500–3800 BCE) ===
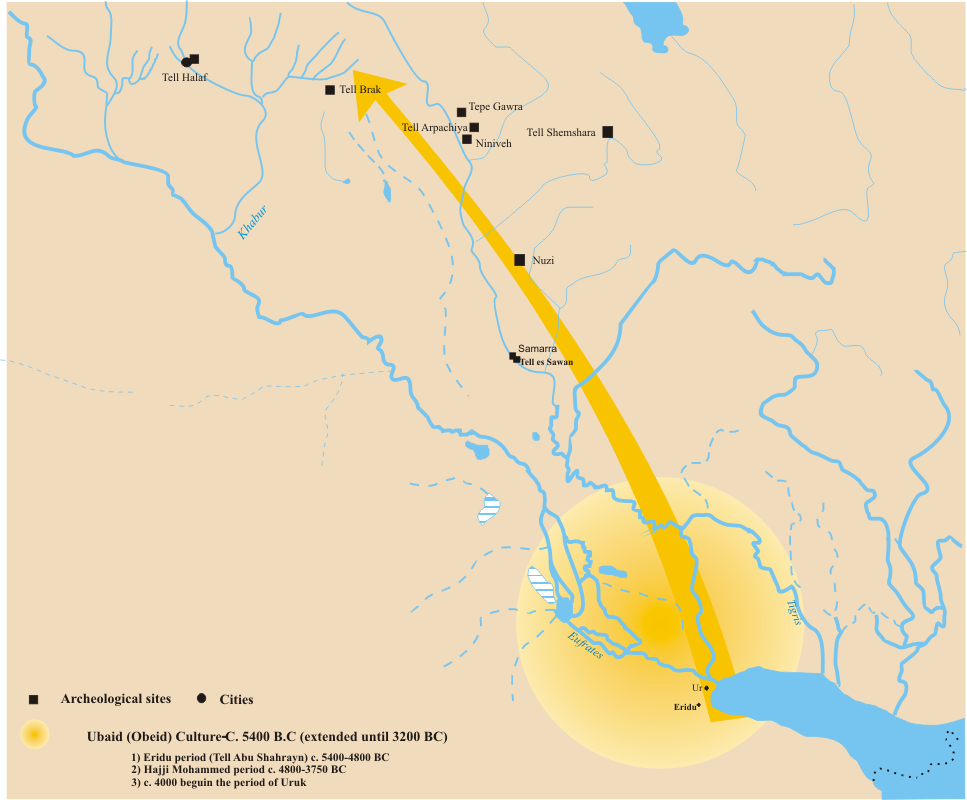
Northern expansion of the Ubaid culture after c.4500 BCE.

The Ubaid period (c. 6500–3800 BCE) is a prehistoric period of Mesopotamia. The name derives from Tell al-'Ubaid in Southern Mesopotamia, where the earliest large excavation of Ubaid period material was conducted initially by Henry Hall and later by Leonard Woolley.

In South Mesopotamia the period is the earliest known period on the alluvial plain although it is likely earlier periods exist obscured under the alluvium. In the south it has a very long duration between about 6500 and 3800 BCE when it is replaced by the Uruk period.

In North Mesopotamia, Ubaid culture expanded during the period between about 5300 and 4300 BCE. It is preceded by the Halaf period and the Halaf-Ubaid Transitional period and succeeded by the Late Chalcolithic period. The new period is named Northern Ubaid to distinguish it from the proper Ubaid in southern Mesopotamia.

With Ubaid 3 (circa 4500 BCE) numerous examples of Ubaid pottery have been found along the Persian Gulf, as far as Dilmun, where Indus Valley Civilization pottery has also been found.

Stamps seals start to depict animals in stylistic fashion, and also bear the first known depiction of the Master of Animals at the end of the period, circa 4000 BCE.

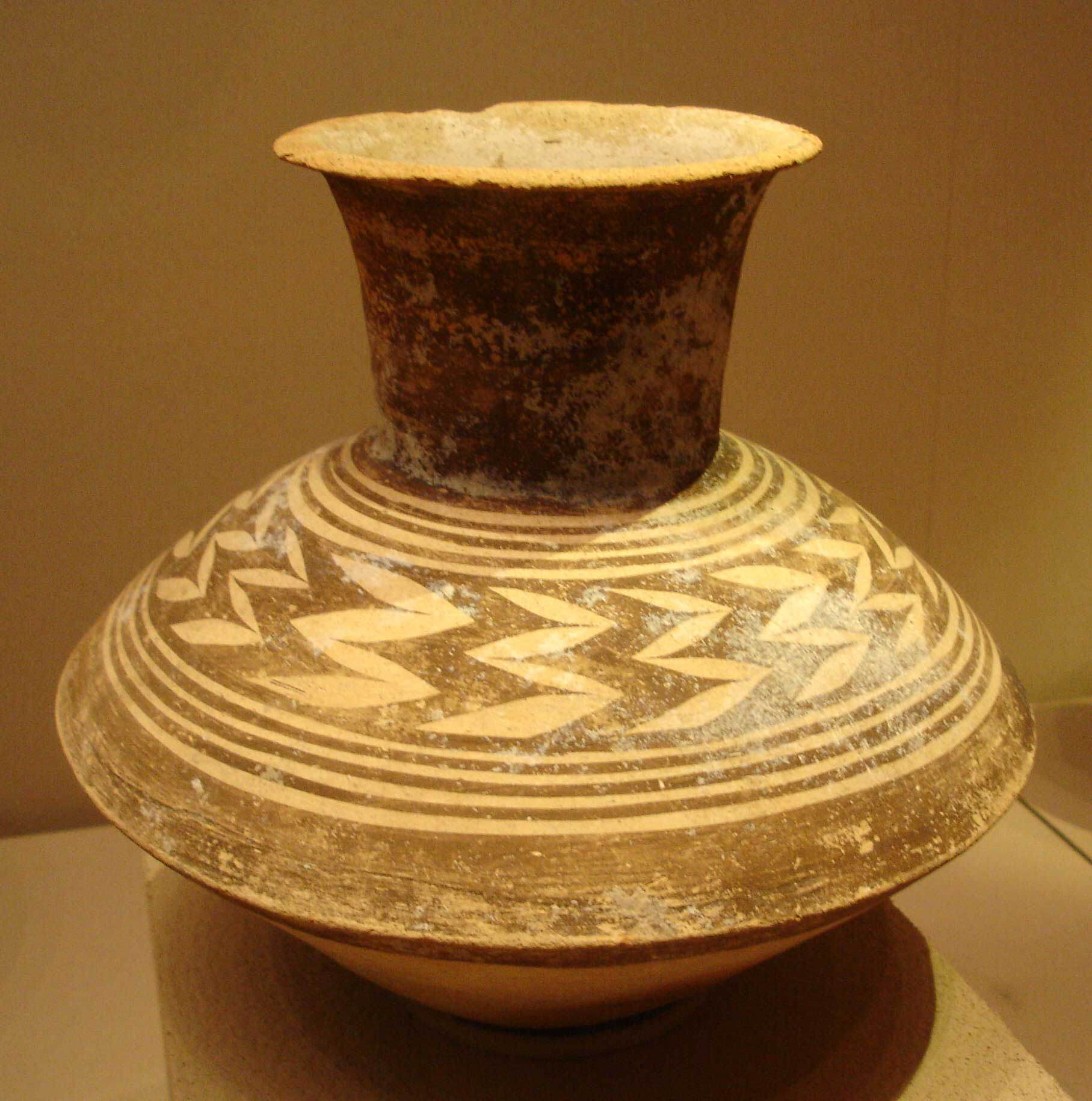
Jar; Late Ubaid period (4500-4000 BC); pottery; from Southern Iraq; Museum of Fine Arts, Boston (USA)

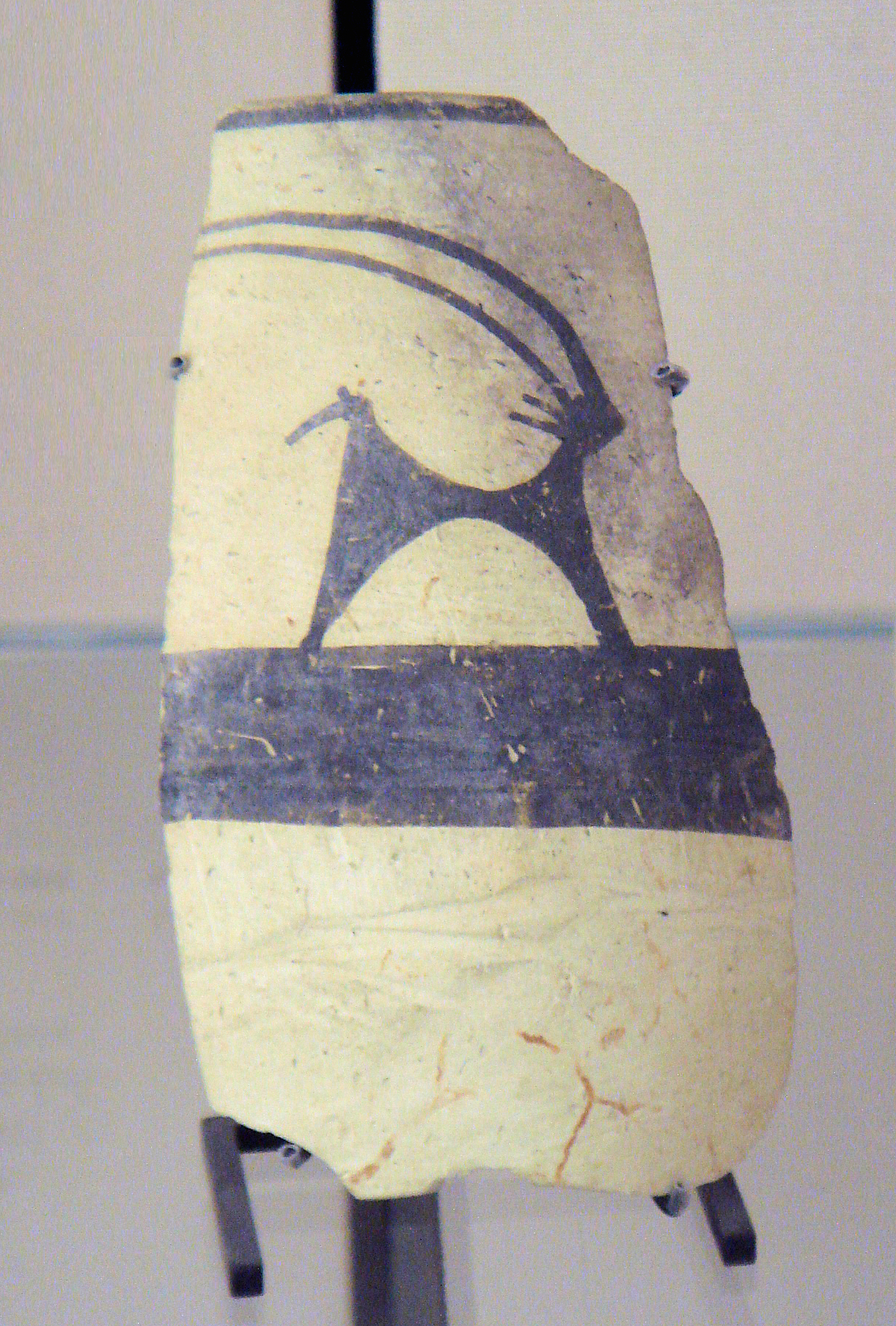
Fragment of pottery with a painting of an Ibex; 4700-4200 BC; painted ceramic; from Girsu; Louvre

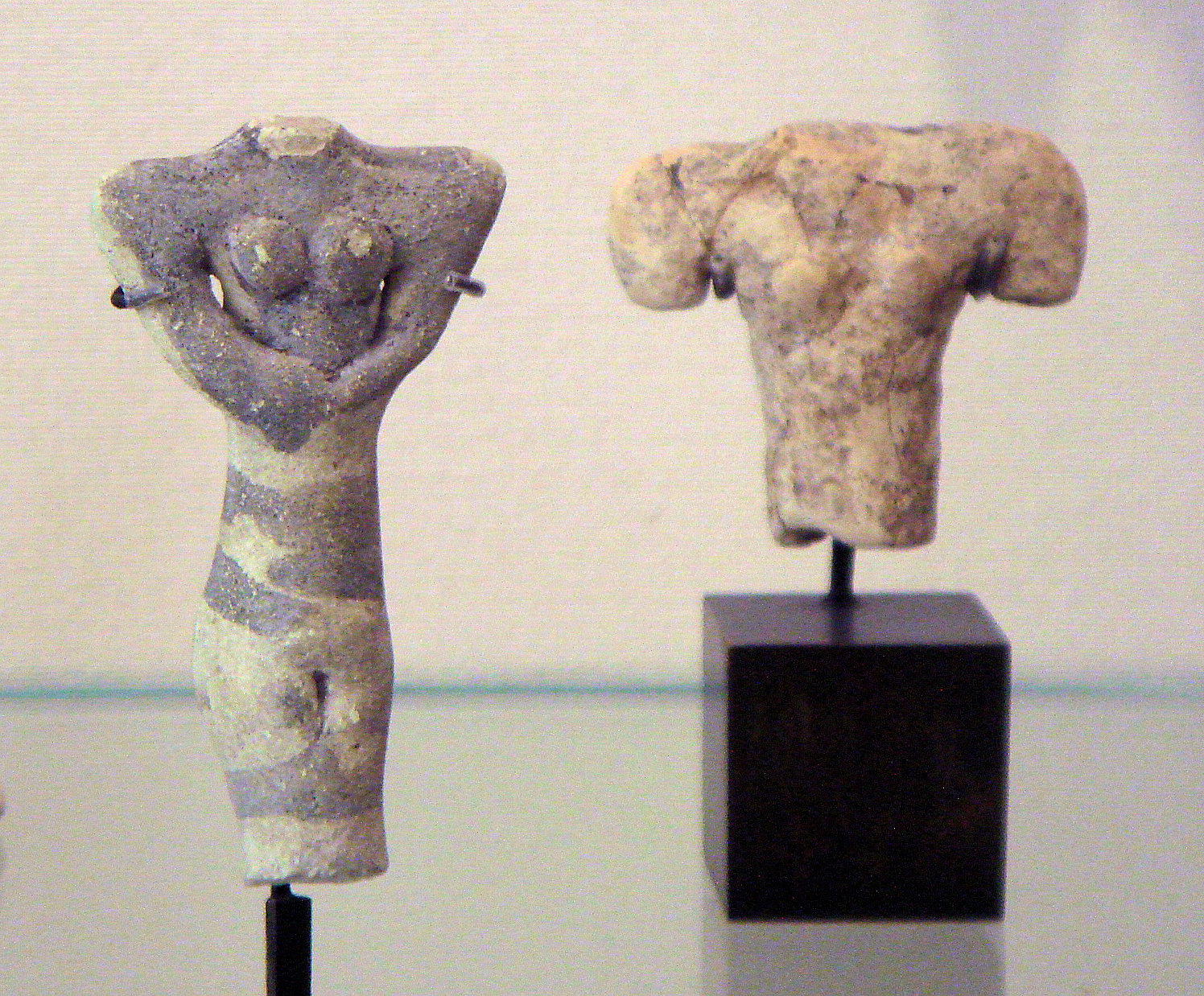
Female figurines; 4700-4200 BC; ceramic; from Girsu; Louvre

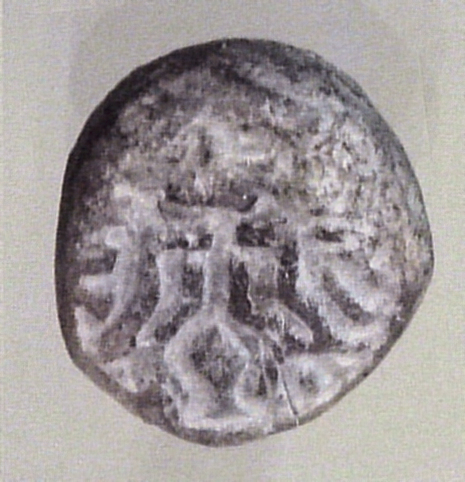
Terracotta stamp seal with Master of Animals motif, Tello, ancient Girsu, End of Ubaid period, Louvre Museum AO14165. Circa 4000 BC.

== Diffusion ==
=== Indus Valley Civilization (5500–2000 BCE) ===
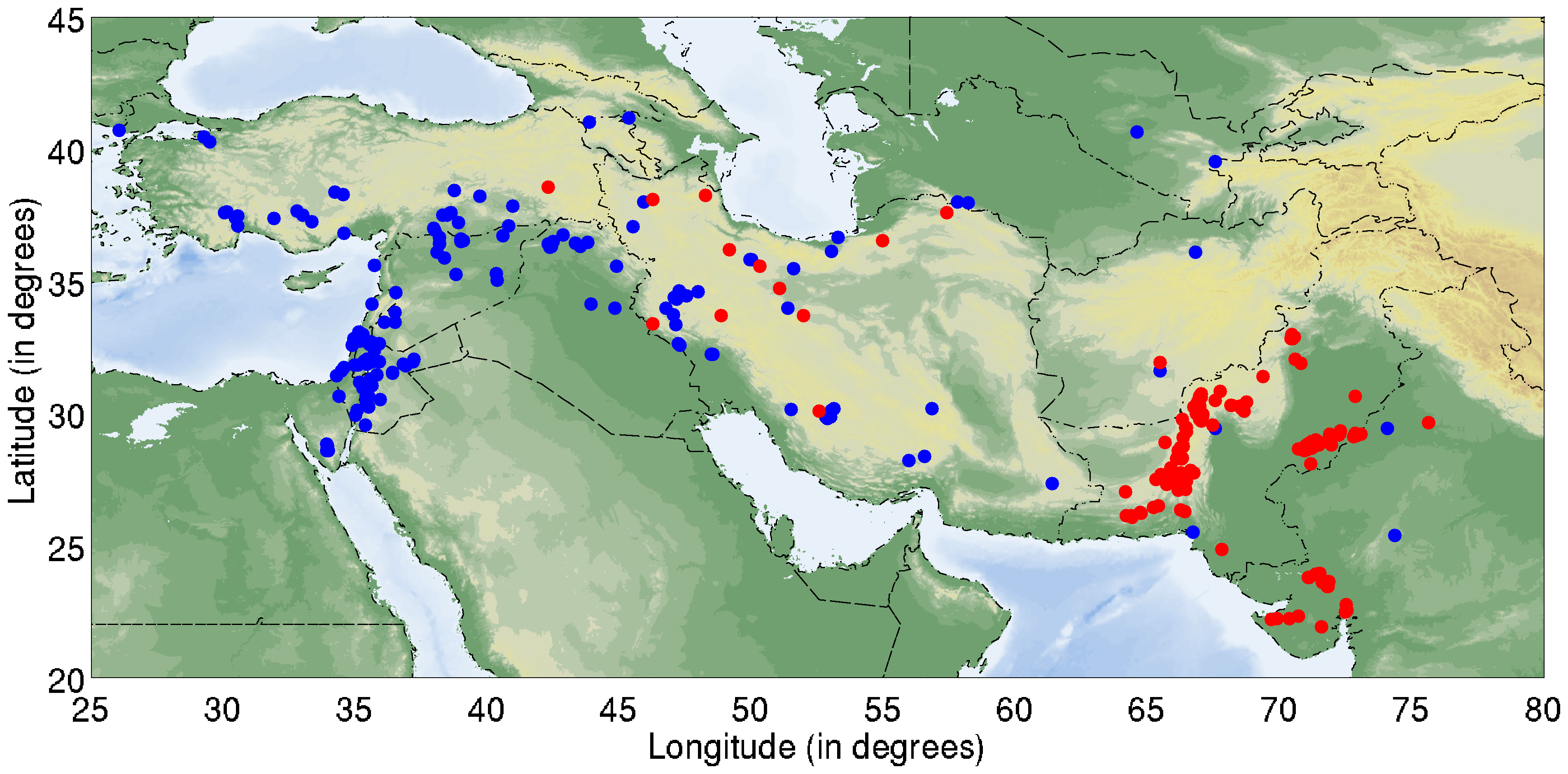
Early Neolithic sites in the Near East and South Asia 10,000–3,800 BCE

The Fertile Crescent in the Ancient Near East is one of the independent origins of the Neolithic, the source from which farming and pottery-making spread across Europe from 9,000 to 6,000 years ago at an average rate of about 1 km/yr. There is also strong evidence for causal connections between the Near-Eastern Neolithic and that further east, up to the Indus Valley. There are several lines of evidence that support the idea of connection between the Neolithic in the Near East and in the Indian subcontinent. The prehistoric site of Mehrgarh in Baluchistan (modern Pakistan) is the earliest Neolithic site in the north-west Indian subcontinent, dated as early as 8500 BCE. Neolithic domesticated crops in Mehrgarh include more than barley and a small amount of wheat. There is good evidence for the local domestication of barley and the zebu cattle at Mehrgarh, but the wheat varieties are suggested to be of Near-Eastern origin, as the modern distribution of wild varieties of wheat is limited to Northern Levant and Southern Turkey. A detailed satellite map study of a few archaeological sites in the Baluchistan and Khybar Pakhtunkhwa regions also suggests similarities in early phases of farming with sites in Western Asia. Pottery prepared by sequential slab construction, circular fire pits filled with burnt pebbles, and large granaries are common to both Mehrgarh and many Mesopotamian sites. The postures of the skeletal remains in graves at Mehrgarh bear strong resemblance to those at Ali Kosh in the Zagros Mountains of southern Iran. Despite their scarcity, the 14C and archaeological age determinations for early Neolithic sites in Southern Asia exhibit remarkable continuity across the vast region from the Near East to the Indian Subcontinent, consistent with a systematic eastward spread at a speed of about 0.65 km/yr.

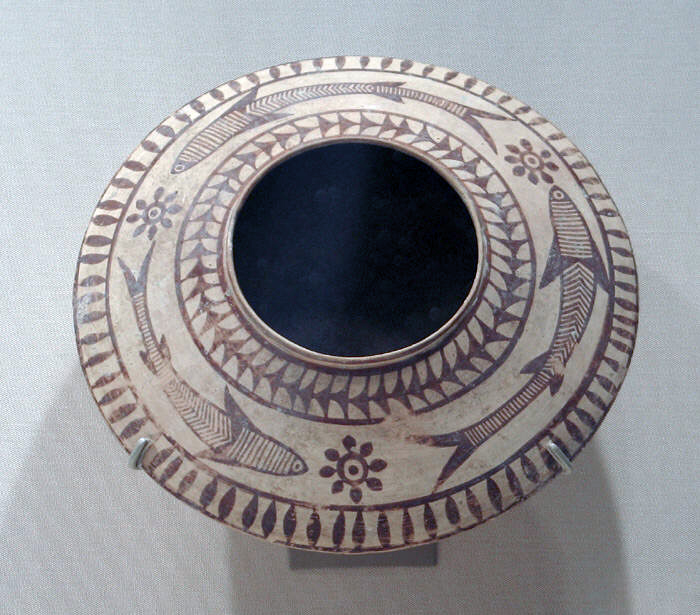
Mehrgarh painted pottery. 3000-2500 BCE.

During the Mehrgarh Culture, precursor of the Indus Valley Civilization, Period II (5500 BCE–4800 BCE) and Merhgarh Period III (4800 BCE–3500 BCE) were ceramic Neolithic, using pottery, and later chalcolithic. Period II is at site MR4 and Period III is at MR2. Much evidence of manufacturing activity has been found and more advanced techniques were used. Glazed faience beads were produced and terracotta figurines became more detailed. Figurines of females were decorated with paint and had diverse hairstyles and ornaments. Two flexed burials were found in Period II with a red ochre cover on the body. The amount of burial goods decreased over time, becoming limited to ornaments and with more goods left with burials of females. The first button seals were produced from terracotta and bone and had geometric designs. Technologies included stone and copper drills, updraft kilns, large pit kilns and copper melting crucibles. There is further evidence of long-distance trade in Period II: important as an indication of this is the discovery of several beads of lapis lazuli, once again from Badakshan. Mehrgarh Periods II and III are also contemporaneous with an expansion of the settled populations of the borderlands at the western edge of South Asia, including the establishment of settlements like Rana Ghundai, Sheri Khan Tarakai, Sarai Kala, Jalilpur and Ghaligai.

=== Europe ===
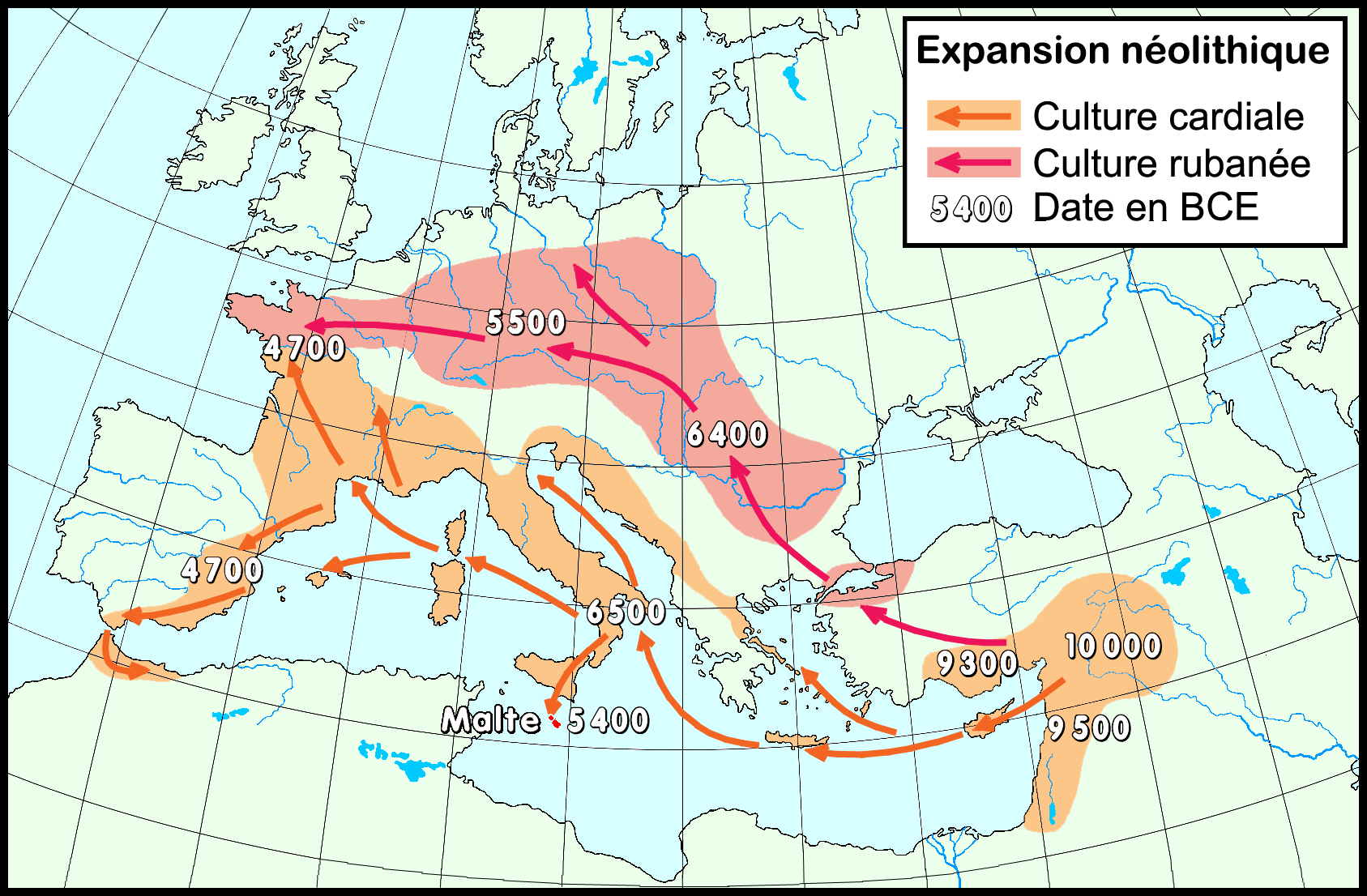
Neolithic expansion of Cardium pottery and Linear Pottery culture according to archaeology.

The European Neolithic is generally dated to 7000–3000 BCE. The spread of the Neolithic in Europe was first studied quantitatively in the 1970s, when a sufficient number of 14C age determinations for early Neolithic sites had become available. Ammerman and Cavalli-Sforza discovered a linear relationship between the age of an Early Neolithic site and its distance from the conventional source in the Near East (Jericho), thus demonstrating that, on average, the Neolithic spread at a constant speed of about 1 km/yr. More recent studies confirm these results and yield the speed of 0.6–1.3 km/yr at 95% confidence level.

==== Greece ====
Neolithic Greece is marked by some remarkable creations from stone or pottery. The settlement at Sesklo gives its name to the earliest known Neolithic culture of Europe, which inhabited Thessaly and parts of Macedonia. The oldest fragments researched at Sesklo place development of the civilization as far back as c. 7510 BCE — c. 6190 BCE, known as "proto-Sesklo" and "pre-Sesklo". They show an advanced agriculture and a very early use of pottery that rivals in age those documented in the Near East.

Ceramic decoration evolves to flame motifs toward the end of the Sesklo culture. Pottery of this "classic" Sesklo style also was used in Western Macedonia, as at Servia. That there are many similarities between the rare Asia Minor pottery and early Greek Neolithic pottery was acknowledged when investigations were made regarding whether these settlers could be migrants from Asia Minor, but such similarities seem to exist among all early pottery found in near eastern regions. The repertoire of shapes is not very different, but the Asia Minor vessels demonstrate significant differences.

The Sesklo culture is crucial in the expansion of the Neolithic into Europe. Dating and research points to the influence of Sesklo culture on both the Karanovo and Körös cultures that seem to originate there, and who in turn, gave rise to the important Danube civilization current.

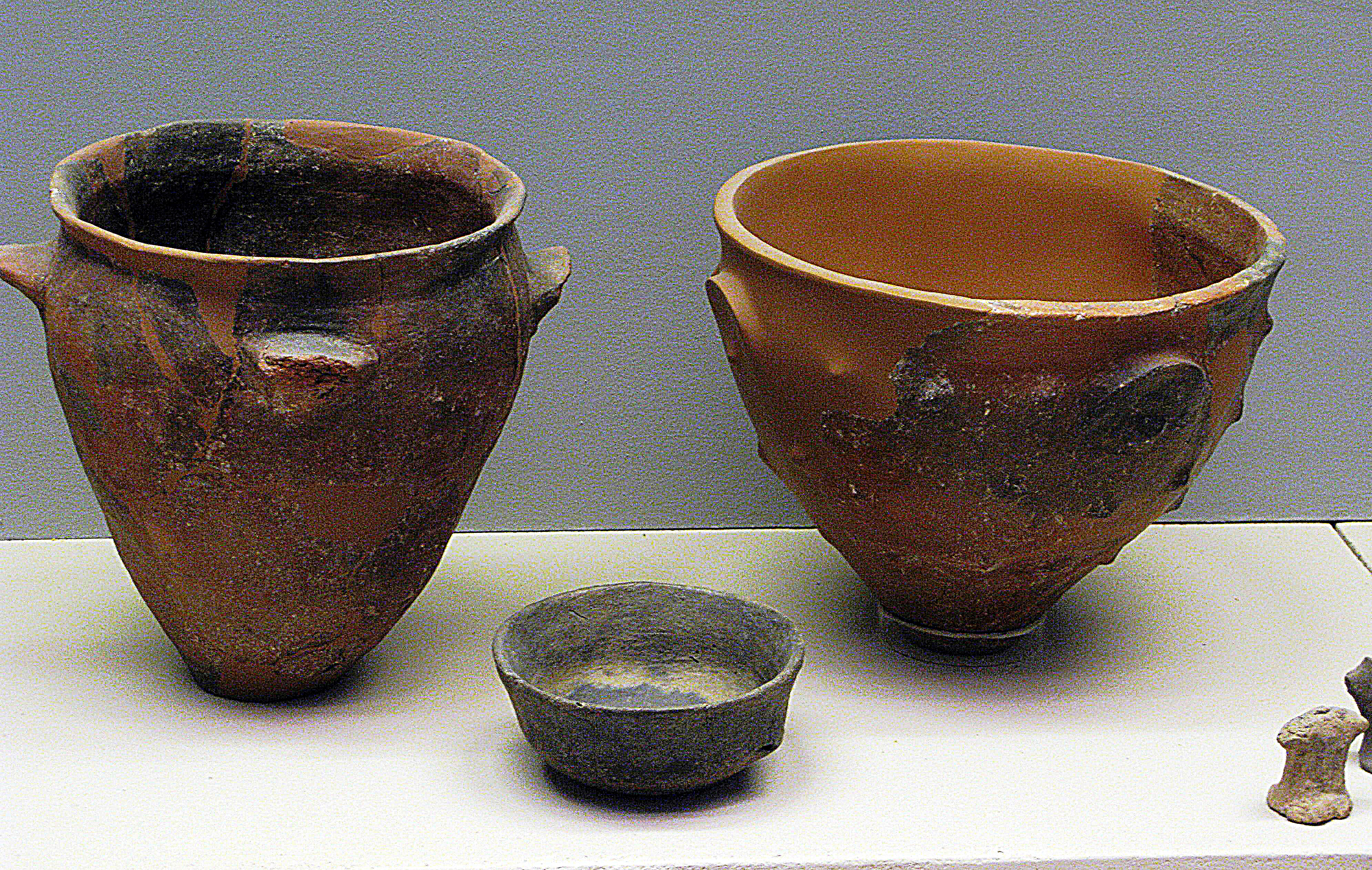
Neolithic clay cups from Sesklo, circa 5,500 BCE. National Museum Athens

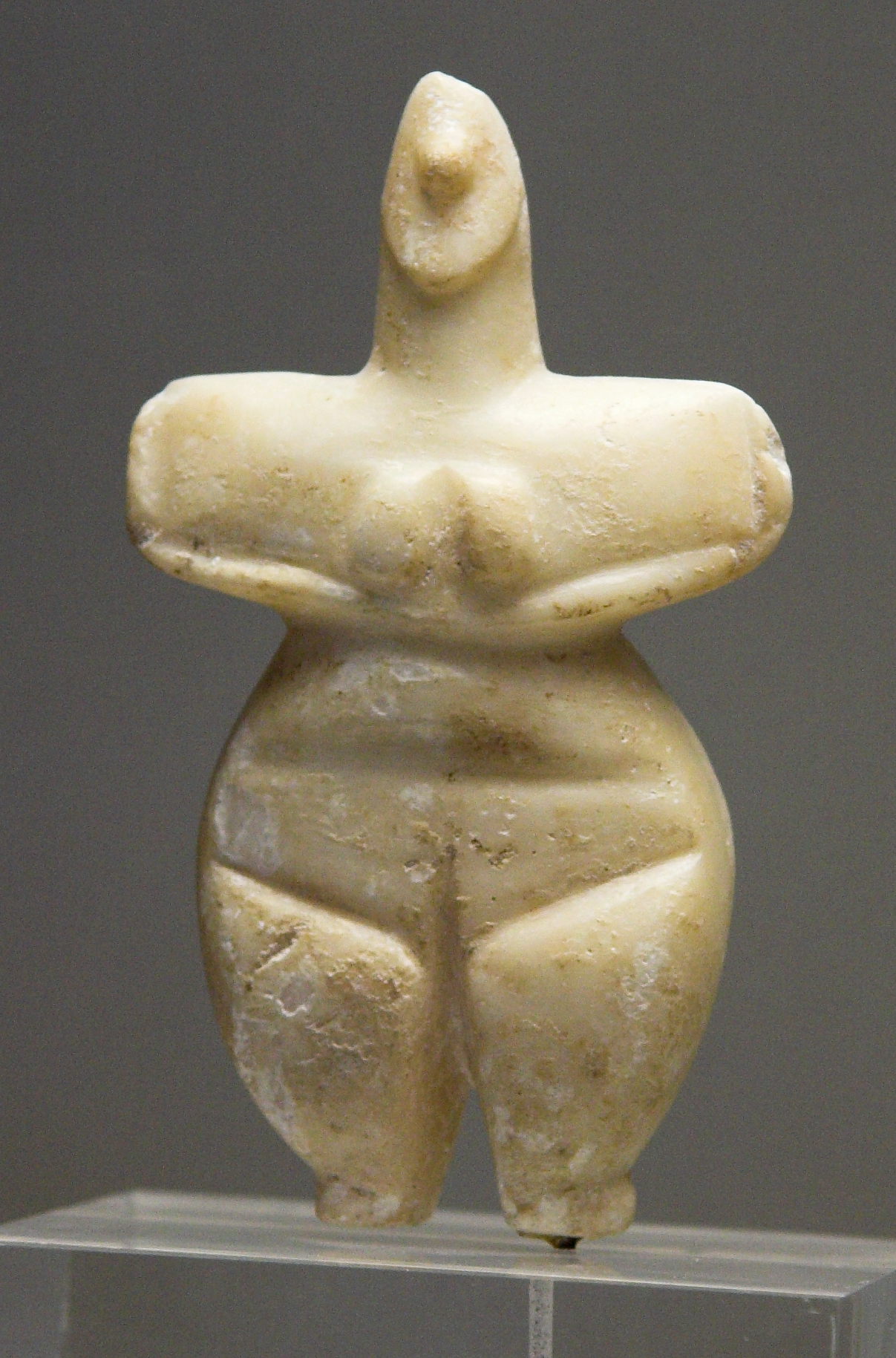
Female figurine, marble, Thessaly, 5,300–3,300 BCE

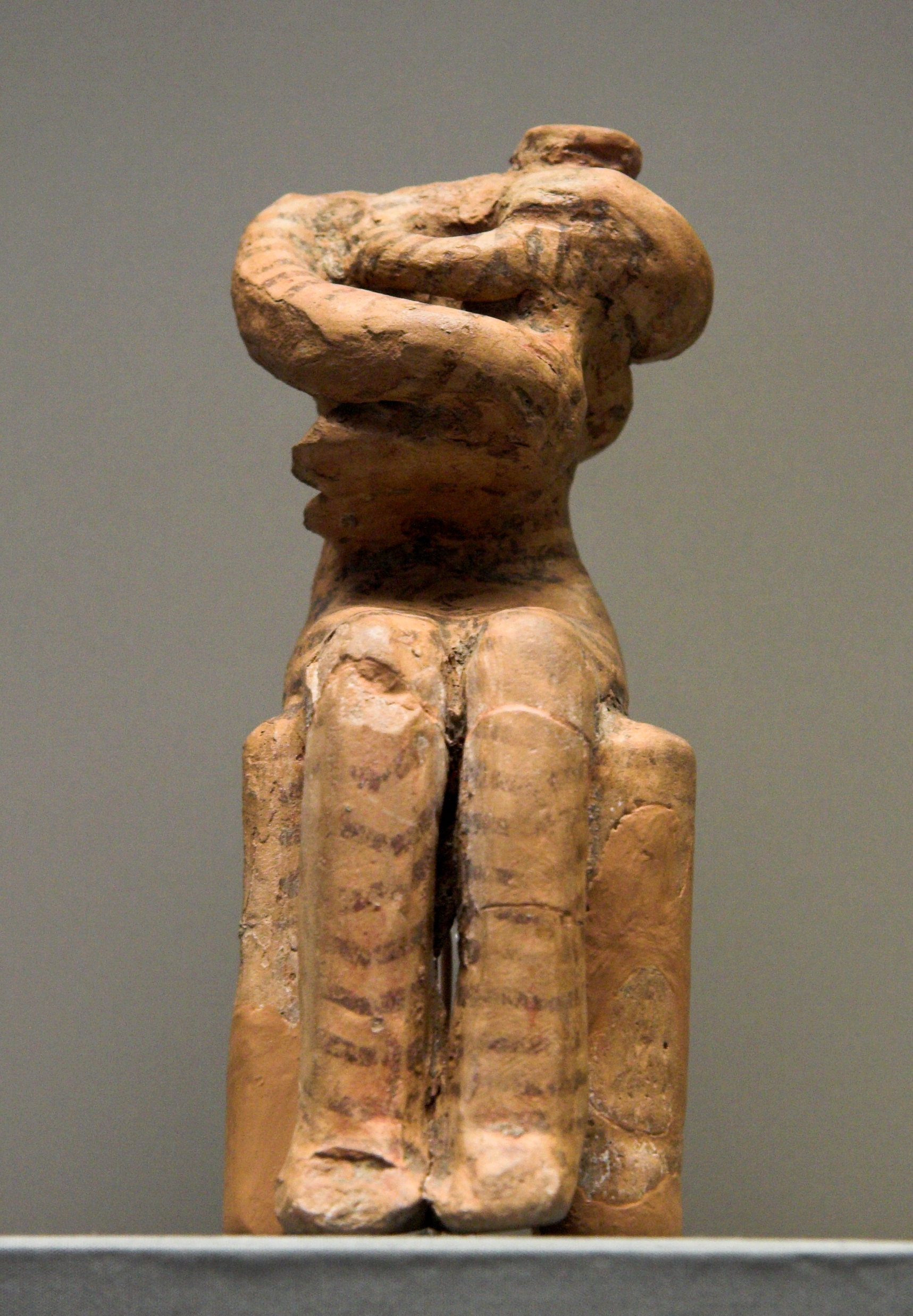
Female figurine of a woman holding a baby, Sesklo, Neolithic, 4,800–4,500 BCE

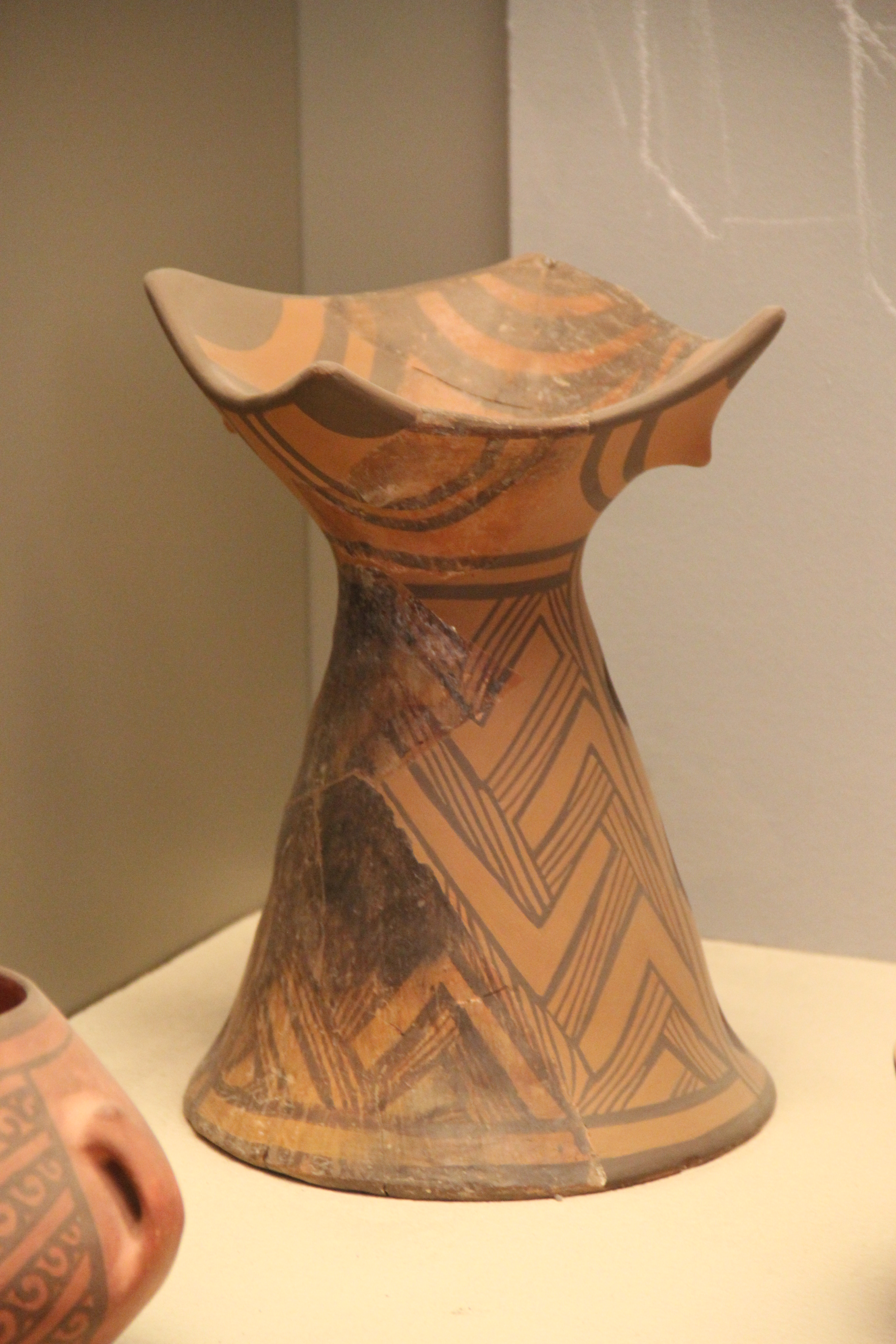
Sesklo culture vase

==== Central and Northern Europe: Linear Pottery culture (5500–4500 BCE) ====
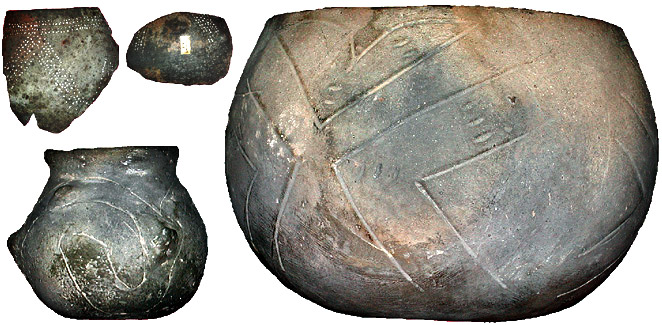
Linear pottery: "The vessels are oblated globes, cut off on the top and slightly flattened on the bottom suggestive of a gourd."—Frank Hibben Note the imitation of painted bands by incising the edges of the band. Stroked Ware is shown in the upper left corner.

The Linear Pottery culture is a major archaeological horizon of the European Neolithic, flourishing c. 5500–4500 BCE. It is abbreviated as "LBK" (from German: Linearbandkeramik), and is also known as the "Linear Band Ware", "Linear Ware", "Linear Ceramics" or "Incised Ware culture", and falls within the "Danubian I culture" of V. Gordon Childe.

The densest evidence for the culture is on the middle Danube, the upper and middle Elbe, and the upper and middle Rhine. It represents a major event in the initial spread of agriculture in Europe. The pottery after which it was named consists of simple cups, bowls, vases, and jugs, without handles, but in a later phase with lugs or pierced lugs, bases, and necks.

Important sites include Nitra in Slovakia; Bylany in the Czech Republic; Langweiler and Zwenkau in Germany; Brunn am Gebirge in Austria; Elsloo, Sittard, Köln-Lindenthal, Aldenhoven, Flomborn, and Rixheim on the Rhine; Lautereck and Hienheim on the upper Danube; and Rössen and Sonderhausen on the middle Elbe.

Two variants of the early Linear Pottery culture are recognized:

- The Early or Western Linear Pottery Culture developed on the middle Danube, including western Hungary, and was carried down the Rhine, Elbe, Oder, and Vistula.
- The Eastern Linear Pottery Culture flourished in eastern Hungary.

Middle and late phases are also defined. In the middle phase, the Early Linear Pottery culture intruded upon the Bug-Dniester culture and began to manufacture "musical note" or notenkopf pottery, where lines are sometimes interrupted by dots and stabs. In the late phase, the Stroked Pottery culture moved down the Vistula and Elbe.

A number of cultures ultimately replaced the Linear Pottery culture over its range, but without a one-to-one correspondence between its variants and the replacing cultures. The culture map, instead, is complex. Some of the successor cultures are the Hinkelstein, Großgartach, Rössen, Lengyel, Cucuteni-Trypillian, and Boian-Maritza cultures.

The Neolithic period in Europe was succeeded by the Bronze Age, circa 3000 BCE.

== Sources ==
- Bellwood, Peter (November 30, 2004). First Farmers: The Origins of Agricultural Societies. Wiley-Blackwell. p. 384. ISBN 978-0-631-20566-1.
- Hibben, Frank (1958). Prehistoric Man in Europe. Norman, Oklahoma: University of Oklahoma Press.
