= Grossgartach culture =

Neolithic culture of Central Europe, c. 4750–4650 BCE

The Grossgartach culture was an archaeological culture of the Middle Neolithic that flourished around 4750/4650 BCE, spanning the regions of the Rhine (middle Rhine, upper Rhine/Alsace), southern Germany, and northern and northeastern Switzerland. It was succeeded by the Rössen culture between 4600 and 4300 BCE.

== Characteristics ==
The Grossgartach culture is characterized by distinctive pottery and stone tools. The ceramic repertoire included bowl-shaped vessels (Kümpfe) with sharply carinated profiles and lower walls than those of earlier Hinkelstein and Linear Pottery ceramics, as well as footed cup-shaped vessels typical of the Hinkelstein tradition. Shallow bowls and decorated vessels were common, featuring shallow impressions created with spatulas as ornamental techniques. Typical decorative elements included ribbon and garland motifs as well as concave triangles. Undecorated vessels displayed rounded walls, distinguishing them from earlier Hinkelstein production. Quadrilobate-rimmed bowls (Zipfelschalen) have also been recovered.

Stone tools included D-section adzes (Schuhleistenkeile), numerous axe blades, and perforated axes. The substantial differences in decorative styles suggest a degree of chronological distance from Hinkelstein ceramics.

The slightly later Planig-Friedberg ceramics (c. 4650/4600 BCE)—now considered a distinct group—show clear connections to Grossgartach, characterized by sharply carinated vessels almost entirely decorated with incised motifs and quadrilobate-rimmed bowls. This period also marks the origins of multi-naved house foundations with convex lateral walls, representing an evolution from the Late Linear Pottery settlement plans.

== Distribution ==
In northeastern Switzerland, various archaeological sites have yielded Grossgartach and Planig-Friedberg ceramics. These include Wetzikon-Himmerich, Zurich-Seefeld, Oberhallau-Überhürst, and Gächlingen-Goldäcker. The decorative styles at these sites are comparable to those from more significant sites in southern Germany and allow for reliable typological classification. In most cases, only ceramic fragments have been discovered; to date, clearly identified Grossgartach settlements or burial sites have not been definitively identified in northeastern Switzerland.

== Bibliography ==
- Société suisse de préhistoire et d'archéologie (ed.): La Suisse du Paléolithique à l'aube du Moyen-Age. De l'homme de Néandertal à Charlemagne, vol. 2, 1995.
- Stöckli, Werner E.: Absolute und relative Chronologie des Früh- und Mittelneolithikums in Westdeutschland (Rheinland und Rhein-Main-Gebiet), 2002.
- Stöckli, Werner E.: Urgeschichte der Schweiz im Überblick (15'000 v.Chr.-Christi Geburt). Die Konstruktion einer Urgeschichte, 2016.
- Altorfer, Kurt; Hartmann, Chantal: Frühe Bauern im Klettgau. Der alt- und mittelneolithische Siedlungsplatz Gächlingen-Goldäcker, 2018.
