= Langweiler (archaeological site) =

Site in the Merzbach Valley of Western Germany

Coordinates: 50°52′54″N 6°15′10″E

Langweiler (German pronunciation: [ˈlaŋvaɪlɐ]) is an archaeological site situated in the Merzbach Valley on the Aldenhovener Plateau of western Germany. Systematic excavations have revealed evidence of 160 houses from eight distinct settlement sites, plus three enclosures and a cemetery, belonging to the period 5300-4900 BC. The site is a key region for understanding the nature of the earliest farming societies in west-central Europe (Bandkeramik era).

Extensive surveys done from 1973 to 1981 contributed to recovery of the largest settlements in the valley before destruction of the area for mining.

== Settlement types ==
There are different types of settlements at Langweiler. The sites can be divided into three groupings on the basis of size: single farmsteads, clusters of 2-3 farmsteads and II farmsteads. Each settlement had access to a portion of the valley floor, perhaps seasonal pasture for cattle and to the drier gravel terraces for farming.

The settlement at Langweiler 8 lasted over 300 years, with permanent occupation of about 15 houses.

== House types ==
The houses of Langweiler settlements fall into three types - long, medium and small – and these are present in the proportions 83:12:5. Medium and smaller houses are found only in the middle and later phases of the Langweiler settlement cycle. Most houses are oriented northwest/southeast, perhaps in response to the prevailing wind direction in central and western Europe, but also indicating adherence to a long-established cultural norm.

The building parcels at Langweiler 9 show up to four outlines, indicating multiple rebuilding at the same location.

== Farming economy ==
The agricultural basis for these Bandkeramik settlements is reconstructed as small-scale cereal cultivation in fixed plots adjacent to the settlements. This replaces an earlier model that proposed shifting slash-and-burn agriculture as the typical Bandkeramik farming mode. Land may have been cleared for agriculture by burning off the vegetation, but the abundance of weed seeds suggests that fields were in use for periods long enough for persistent weed communities to become established.

== Ritual activities ==
During the latest stage of the Merzbach Bandkeramik period, special enclosures were constructed which may have been the setting for social or ritual activities by whole communities. These were built in areas clear of houses, or on the edges of settlements, as if for special gatherings. The enclosure at Langweiler 9 is thought to have continued use (for occasional feasts) after the adjacent settlement has been abandoned. Shortly afterwards, the Bandkeramik occupation of the Merzbach Valley came to an end.
