= Archaeology of Cyprus =

The archaeology of Cyprus involves the analysis of human activity derived from Cypriot artefacts and architecture from the Neolithic through to the British period. The earliest archaeological discoveries in Cyprus are attributed to European amateur collectors or “treasure hunters” during the early 19th century. By the mid 19th century, systematic fieldwork and excavations were conducted on various sites involving studying the remains of Cypriot cemeteries and tombs, maritime artefacts, architecture, pottery as well as a range of other individual artefacts. Subsequent findings and analysis detail the social and physical landscapes of ancient Cyprus as well as their evolving culture, religious beliefs and technology throughout antiquity.

Archaeological developments are supported by international and local institutions that sponsor lectures on various Cypriot topics, seminars, excavation work and surveys. Modern issues of uncontrolled tourism and economic development are being controlled by the Department of Antiquities through rescue excavations and the relocation of museum excavations to avoid overcrowding. Knowledge of Cypriot archaeology continues to expand from publications of new findings from surveys and excavation work in accordance with the growth of technology.

== Institutions ==
Institutions involved in Cyprus's archaeology are both local and international. These institutions are involved in the commencement of new archaeological projects in Cyprus. They have also contributed to the publishing of past findings, sponsoring lectures, seminars and colloquia based on various topics related to Cypriot archaeology within Cyprus and internationally in North America and other parts of Europe.

=== Department of Antiquities of the Republic of Cyprus ===
The Department of Antiquities was established in 1935 by the British colonial government. John Robert Hilton served as the first director between 1934 and 1935. He was succeeded by Peter Megaw (1935-1960), Porphyrios Dikaios (1960-1963), Vassos Karageorghis (1963-1989), and Athanasios Papageorgiou (1989-1991). Demos Christou was director from 1992-1997, succeeded by Sophocles Hadjisavvas.

The department has been involved in numerous initiatives to protect popular ancient sites within Cyprus, involving the site’s presentation, excavation projects and managing tourism. Plans for Paphos have been in the works since 1995 and initiatives supporting Kato Paphos, Kourion, Khirokitia and Kouklia have been completed. In order to target recent ethical issues and overcrowding, the Department has initiated a further policy focused on decentralising the exhibitions of antiquities closer to their original area of discovery, which has subsequently helped disperse tourism.

=== Archaeological Research Unit ===
The Archaeological Research Unit (ARU) opened in 1996 as part of the University of Cyprus. Its new Department of History and Archaeology is chaired by Demetrios Michaelides. Symposia and lectures on Cypriot archaeology continue to be sponsored by the research unit.

=== Cyprus American Archaeological Research Institute ===
The Cyprus American Archaeological Research Institute (CAARI) is the only foreign archaeological institution involved in Cyprus’s archaeology. The institution sponsors educational lectures, seminars, field trips, fellowships and excavation work regarding Cypriot archaeological development.

=== Bank of Cyprus Cultural Foundation ===
Opened in 1987, the Bank of Cyprus Cultural Foundation is a private institution that has contributed its numismatic collection to the Museum of the History of Cypriot Coinage. It currently holds the largest collection of Cypriot maps and sponsors lectures, conferences and guidebooks about Cyprus's archaeological work.

== Surveys ==
=== Sydney Cyprus Project ===
The Sydney Cyprus Project is directed by A. Bernard Knapp from the University of Glasgow. The project has continued studying the site of the Troodos Mountains, identifying an additional 60 sites within the major site itself. Archaeological studies have indicated the area was heavily occupied during the late Cypro-Archaic, Hellenistic and Ottoman periods. Smaller excavation programs involved analysing and deriving the composition of “slag heaps” at the sites of Mitsero-Kouloupakhis and Mistero-Sykamies.

=== Sia-Marthia-Agia Varvara Survey ===
The Sia-Mathia-Agia Varvara Survey is a Swiss project headed by Walter Fasnacht. Excavations have concentrated at the site of Ayia Varvara Almyras, a copper-rich area. In 1995, an archaeometallurgical survey conducted in the Sha River Valley (modern Sha and Mathiatis mines) aimed to analyse Almyras’s contextual relation to the area’s copper production history.

=== Polis-Pygros Archaeological Project ===
The Polis-Pygros Archaeological Project, directed by Dariusz Maliszewski, involves a limited survey across the large area of northwestern Cyprus. The project has worked specifically on the area surrounding the villages of Yialia, Samara and Kato Pyrgos, discovering dozens of previously unknown or unrecorded sites. The survey further reveals the largely dense occupation of northwestern Cyprus during the late Roman and Byzantine times, corroborating with the studies of the Danish Akamas Project.

=== Maroni Valley Archaeological Survey Project ===
The Maroni Valley Archaeological Survey Project is led by Sturt W. Manning of Cornell University. The project is less active in the archaeological field but has focused on excavations. In a 1966 survey, they excavated at Zygi Petrini, discovering a Roman kiln that has since been studied and recorded.

== Fieldwork and excavations ==
Archaeological fieldwork and excavations in Cyprus began in the 1860s. The development of this local, systematic fieldwork was attributed to international aid from 27 foreign groups and expeditions assisting ongoing Cypriot projects in accordance with the Department of Antiquities. The continuation of fieldwork and excavations are funded by sponsorships from institutions such as the Cyprus American Archaeological Research Institute (CAARI) that has funded projects such as the excavations in Kourion. Modern excavation practices and larger survey projects are bringing focus on selective excavation for sites more likely to be affected by modern development and building plans.

In December 2018, a Byzantine church with mosaics including inscriptions in perfect condition dating back to the reign of Emperor Heraclius was discovered during the twelfth excavation season under the supervision of Dr Eleni Procopiou at the site of Katalymata ton Plakoton, according to an Athens Macedonia News Agency. The Greek Christian mosaic panels included a text-“My Lord help those who honor your name”.

=== Rescue archaeology ===
Rescue archaeology is a widespread, recent practice used to salvage ancient archaeological sites under threat by modern development. It is specifically used to preserve and obtain further understanding of Cyprus’s history. Sites under threat include the Ancient Tamassos Tomb in Paphos due to tourism-associated projects and plans to develop a new archaeological park. The building of hotels at Amathus, an Iron Age city kingdom with a temple to Aphrodite and burial grounds from the Cypro-Geometric to the Roman period, has also prompted rescue archaeology after the discovery of ancient remains during site development. Teams were able to recover a large number of funerary urns still containing the cremated human and animal remains.

== Archaeological Sites ==
Archaeological sites in Cyprus:

- Agios Georgios, Pegeia
- Akrotiri Aetokremnos
- Antiphonitis
- Amathus
- Choirokoitia (Khirokitia)
- Enkomi
- Idalium
- Kalavasos-Tenta
- Kition
- Klimonas
- Kourion
- Kykkos Monastery
- Maa-Palaiokastro (Palaeokastro)
- Nea Pafos (Kato Pafos)
- Notre Dame de Tyre
- Palaipafos (Kouklia)
- Panagia Apsinthiotissa
- Pyla-Kokkinokremnos
- Salamis
- Tamassos
- Tomb of the Kings

== Cemeteries and tombs ==
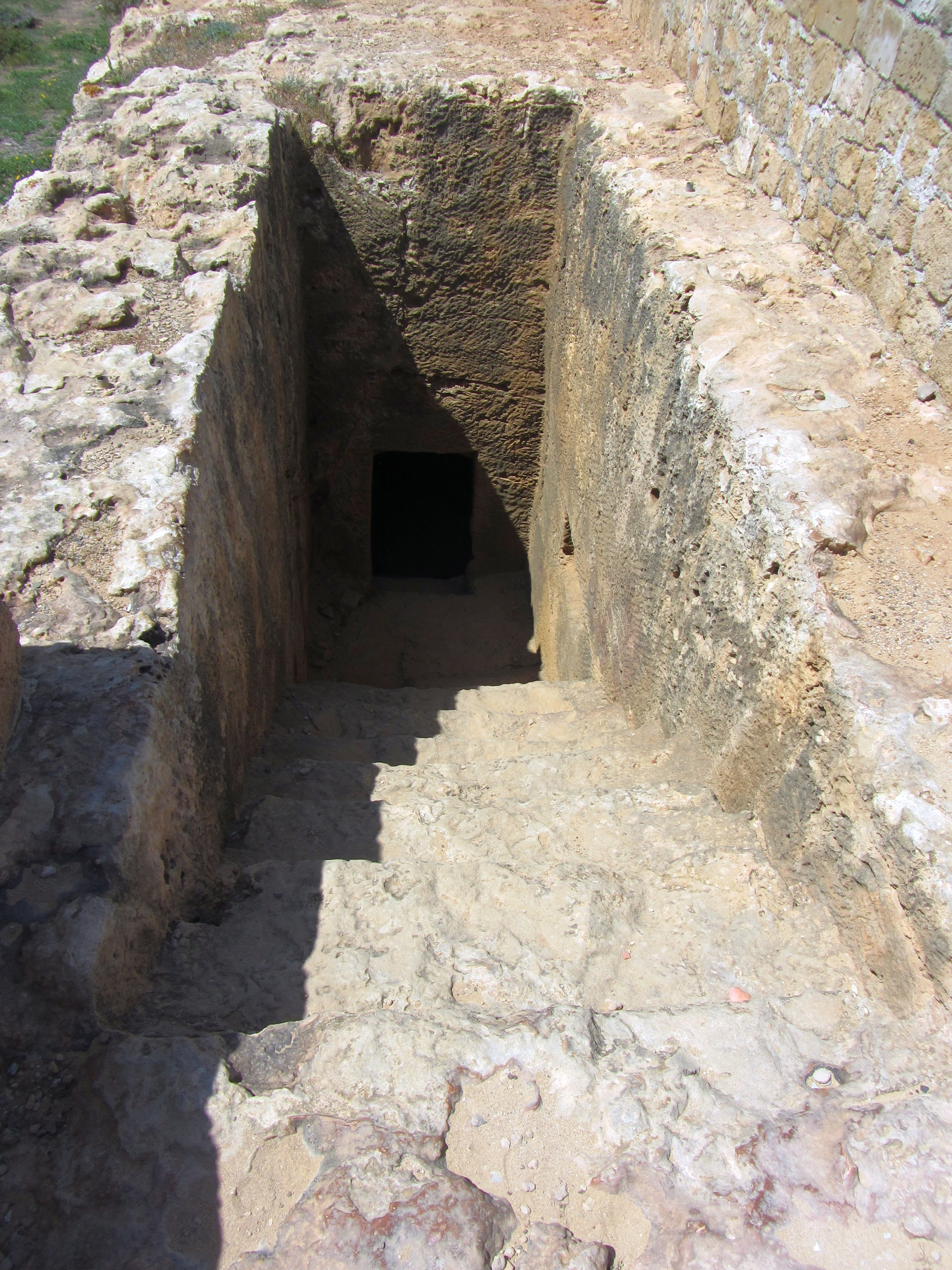
Tomb of the Kings in Paphos

The mortuary features of ancient Cyprus were discovered through tomb excavations and subsequent archaeological findings. The main forms of tombs were pit and chamber tombs. Chamber tombs were carved beneath havara, a limestone subsoil that is solid and hardy, while pit tombs were dug from a softer combination of stone and earth. Throughout history, tombs were often subject to looting that has impaired archaeological analysis of mortuary features and associated artefacts. Other disturbances have been attributed to environmental factors such as natural disasters, or modern building development.

The religious nature of funerary practices was also derived from examples of material display or artefacts inside or near the tomb. Material display such as pottery or figurines were created as a means to help bridge death and subsequent immortality, as well as create ancestral links for the deceased. In May 1995, an accidental discovery was made by Scott L. Manske on tour from the Archaeological Institution of America in Cyprus from his visit to the Dhenia Kafkallia cemetery. Manske discovered several bronze gaming stones, serving as the first known example of a fixed playing surface. In addition, the close proximity of tombs nearby, linked gaming activity as part of ancient Cypriot funerary practices.

== Architectural sites and buildings ==
Cypriot architecture evolved throughout antiquity, displaying foreign and religious influence as well as its entertainment purposes.

The discovery at Kition in the late 1960s was of a temple dating back to 800 BC. Temple remains reveal the use of limestone, columns and four floors linking to the four different time periods associated with the construction of the temple. The temple at Kition shows the variety of resources available to Cypriots and their engineering capabilities throughout the time periods the temple has been renovated.

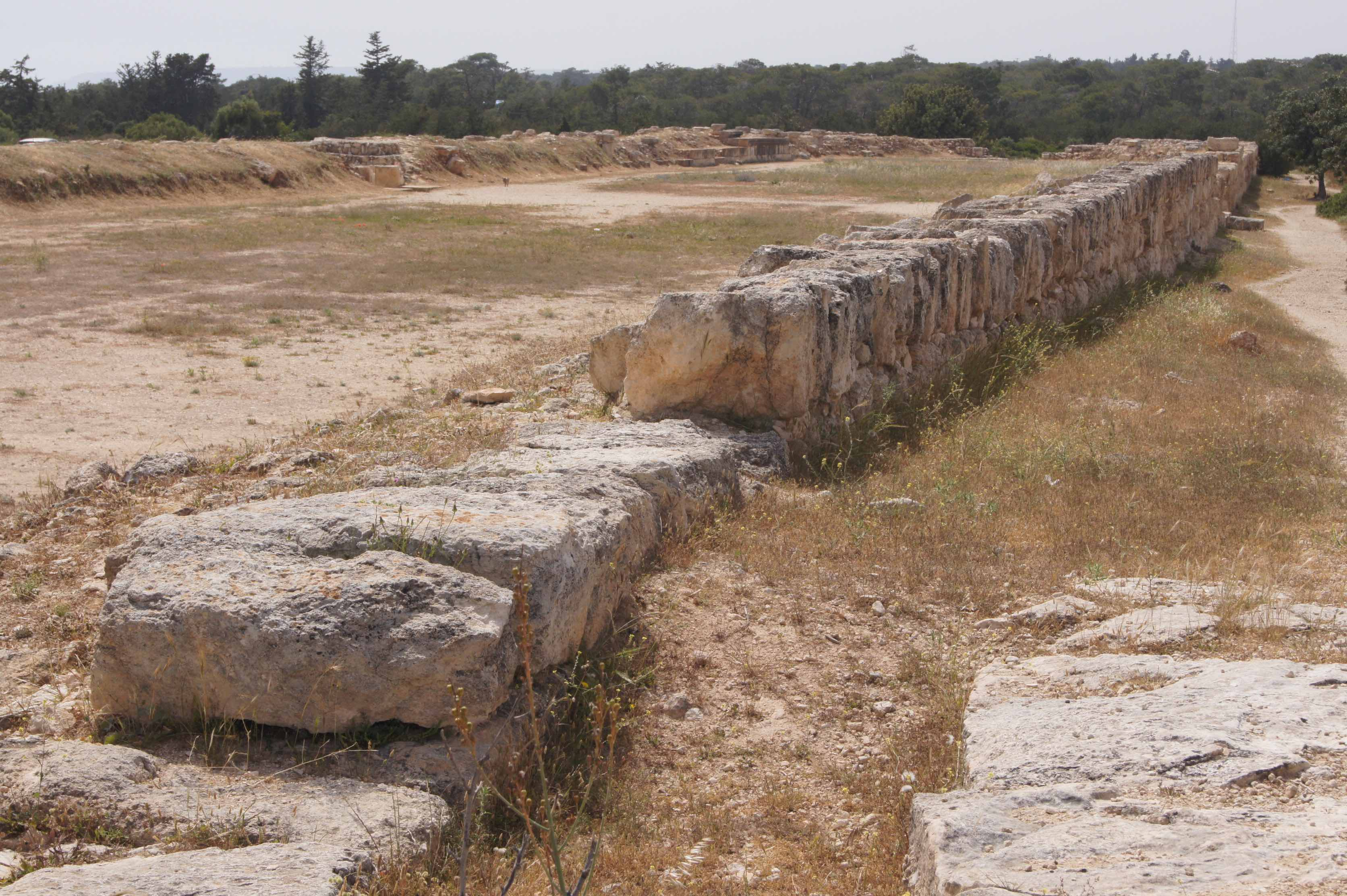
Stadium Kourion

The restoration and analysis of the ancient theatre in Kourion led by the Department of Antiquities of Cyprus is an example of entertainment in ancient Cyprus. In addition, the remains of seats surrounding the main stage of Kourion’s Stadion, estimating 7 rows with a height of 4 meters, shows the large entertainment industry. Further remains show the conversion of Cypriot entertainment to Roman housing after Rome’s expansion, that was later destroyed by natural disasters, namely the earthquakes of AD 322 and 342.

In recent discoveries from Pasydy hill in Nicosia, Archaeologists have found an overlay of buildings from the 5th century BC in the city’s central park also led by the Department of Antiquities. The analysis of Hellenistic structure shows constantly evolving styles of building structures throughout Cyprus’s history.

== Pottery ==
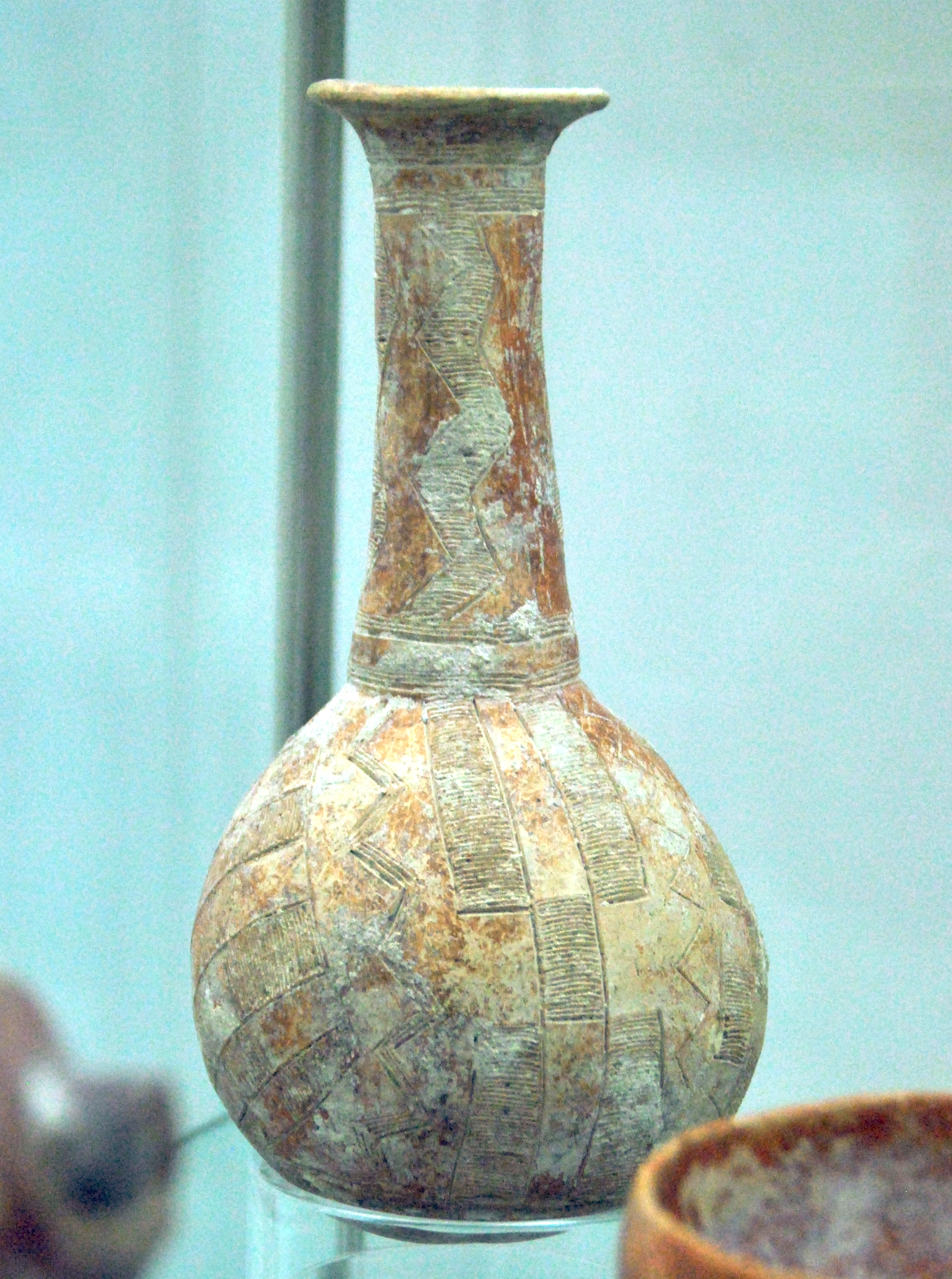
Cypriot vessel of the Red Polished Ware II-III, 2200-1700 BC

Cypriot pottery predominantly served funerary and decorative purposes. Their pottery dates back to the Neolithic period in which pottery remains already show elements of cultural and artistic influence from Cyprus’s Mediterranean neighbours. The dark-faced burnished ware was a common feature of pottery and ceramics as well as red on white ware, combed ware, and combed and painted ware. Early, Mid-Bronze Age potters were inspired to portray unique shapes and adornment, whilst in the Iron Age, potters incorporated bold colours, intricate painted symbols and motifs.

Pottery was most often found within tombs and exhibited widespread coastal influence. During the 1961 department analysis of the site of ‘Paliokastro’, the discovery of partially looted tombs from the Cypro-Archaic and Classic periods (700-400 BC) displayed a variety of different cultural influences. The pottery white painted IV and V, Red II and Biochrome types showed influence and varied import relations with the East Greek. The Samarian bowl and Phoenician carving inside a Cypriote jug suggested close coastal relations throughout the Mediterranean.

== Maritime archaeology ==
=== Maritime archaeology of the north Cypriot coastline before 1974 ===
In the mid 20th century, before the creation and widespread use of the aqualung, maritime archaeology in Cyprus was mainly focused on harbour sites such as Ayios Philon excavated by Joan du Plat Taylor in the 1930s. Surveys were further conducted in Paphos by the British Joint Services Aqua Club and British military divers in the 1960s, focusing on analysing maritime artefacts.

In 1965, Witold Daszewski organised a professional archaeological survey at an ancient Cypriot harbour site, leading the Cyprus Underwater Archaeological Search conducted by Michael Katzev in late 1967. Katzev’s excavations off the north coast of Kyrenia were considered “legendary”. A variety of artefacts were discovered ranging from Rhodian and Samian amphorae, mill stones, drinking cups, and remains of a 4th century BC cargo vessel with its brailing rings, rudder and 60% of its hull. The site was claimed to be the “best preserved” ship from antiquity to be discovered in the Mediterranean, becoming the 2nd most visited tourist site in Cyprus.

=== Maritime archaeology of the north Cypriot coastline after 1974 ===
After 1974, the presence of the Turkish military in the northern part of Cyprus slowed archaeological development locally due to UNESCO’s policies of its Convention for the Protection of Cultural Property in the Event of Armed Conflict or the 1954 Hague Convention. The Hague Convention consists of measures focused on conserving cultural property in the event of war and the use of destructive weaponry. Such measures include branding cultural property with a specific emblem and providing transportation to move cultural property away from warring zones.

The arrival of the Turkish Militia has had numerous repercussions on archaeology in northern Cyprus. The stasis of archaeological work has prompted archaeologists to resume work in other parts of Cyprus, while international teams have followed suit while waiting for peace. The lack of activity has also inhibited the development of protective measures for maritime heritage along the northern coast.

== Tourism and Criticisms ==
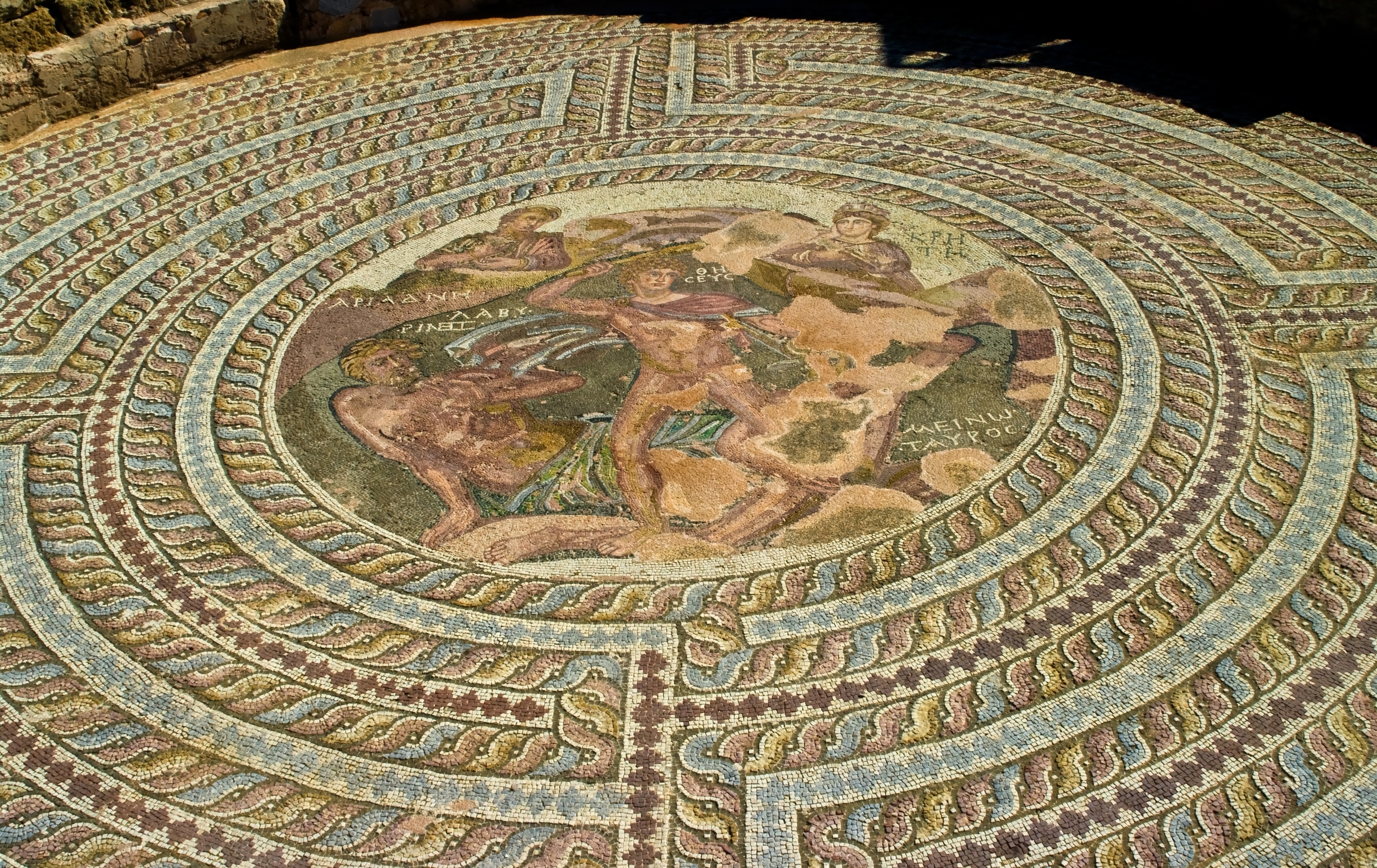
Floor mosaic in the Archaeological Park of Paphos

Tourism and issues of overcrowding and damage to artefacts and ancient sites have affected Cyprus’s archaeological management. Buses of tourists have damaged floor mosaics in Paphos and the Tomb of the Kings. Hotel construction and urban development to accommodate tourism such as hotels, restaurants and parking have additionally sealed or destroyed unexplored parts of Paphos prompting rescue excavations.

In May 1997, landowners near ancient Amathus disputed their compensation for expropriated land due to the heightened touristic development and subsequent increasing land values.

== See also ==
- Category:Archaeological cultures in Cyprus
- Category:Archaeological discoveries in Cyprus
- Category:Archaeological sites in Cyprus
- Category:Archaeological museums in Cyprus

== Sources ==
- Clarke, Joanne T. (January 2001). "Style and Society in Ceramic Neolithic Cyprus". Levant. 33 (1): 65–80. doi:10.1179/lev.2001.33.1.65. S2CID 161672104.
- Dikaios, P. (1961). "Archaeology in Cyprus, 1959-61". Archaeological Reports (8): 32–46. doi:10.2307/581002. JSTOR 581002. S2CID 128580495.
- Herscher, Ellen (1998). "Archaeology in Cyprus". American Journal of Archaeology. 102 (2): 309–354. doi:10.2307/506471. JSTOR 506471. S2CID 245265375.
- Keswani, Priscilla Schuster (2005). "Death, Prestige, and Copper in Bronze Age Cyprus". American Journal of Archaeology. 109 (3): 341–401. doi:10.3764/aja.109.3.341. JSTOR 40026118. S2CID 163462661.
- Knapp, A. Bernard (2013). The Archaeology of Cyprus: From Earliest Prehistory Through the Bronze Age. Cambridge University Press. ISBN 978-0-521-89782-2.
- Nikolaou, K. (1968). "Archaeology in Cyprus, 1966-1969". Archaeological Reports (15): 40–54. doi:10.2307/581007. JSTOR 581007. S2CID 131103177.
