= Kyriakos Nicolaou =

Cypriot archaeologist

Kyriakos Nicolaou FSA (Greek: Κυριάκος Νικολάου) (10 October 1918 – 1981) was a Cypriot archaeologist who worked for the Department of Antiquities, Cyprus.

== Life and works ==
Kyriakos Nicolaou was born in Rizokarpaso in 1918. He attained his primary education in Cyprus, and further education in London. He obtained a B.A. Hons in Classics from University College London under professor T.B.L. Webster. He studied Practical Archaeology at the UCL Institute of Archaeology under professors Mortimer Wheeler and Gordon Childe. Nicolaou earned his PhD at the University of Gothenburg. After returning to Cyprus he started working at the Department of Antiquities in 1957, first as an Archaeological Officer (1957-1961), then as Assistant Curator of the Cyprus Museum (1961-1964) and finally as Curator of the Cyprus Museum (1964-1978).

In 1955 he was appointed Assistant Archaeological Survey Officer. In 1956 he excavated in Enkomi under Porphyrios Dikaios and Claude Schaeffer, additionally in the same year he excavated in Salamis together with Vassos Karageorghis. Later in 1959 while Nicolaou was an Archaeological Officer he was appointed as the head of the Archaeological Survey after the departure of Hector Catling in 1959, after the independence of Cyprus. He surveyed a major part of the district of Kerynia and the Yialias valley in central Cyprus. Later as Assistant Curator he contributed to the management of various museums and conducted excavations, especially in the district of Pafos. Finally as Curator he was responsible for the management of the Cyprus Museum as well as District and Local Museums. He reorganised the exhibition rooms and the storage rooms of the Cyprus Museum and founded the District Museums of Famagusta, Larnaca, Limassol and Pafos, the Local Museums at Kouklia and Episkopi and the Museum of Folk Art and the Shipwreck Museum in Kyrenia. He retired from the Department of Antiquities in 1979.

Kyriakos Nicolaou was a member of the board of directors of the Society of Cypriot Studies (Εταιρεία Κυπριακών Σπουδών), a fellow of the Society of Antiquaries of London, corresponding member of the German Archaeological Institute and fellow of the Archaeological Society of Athens.

== Personal life ==
He was married to fellow archaeologist Ino Nicolaou. He was a friend of Swedish archaeologist Paul Astrom.

== Publications ==
- Nicolaou, K. (1966). The Topography of Nea Paphos. In M. L. Bernhard (Ed.), Mélanges offerts à Kazimierz Michałowski (pp. 561–602). Panstwowe Wydawnictwo Naukowe.
- Nicolaou, K. (1967). The Distribution of Settlements in Stone Age Cyprus. Κυπριακαί Σπουδαί, 37-52.
- Nicolaou, K. (1976). The Historical Topography of Kition. PhD Thesis. University of Gothenburg.
- Nicolaou, K. (1976). Ancient fish‐tanks at Lapithos, Cyprus. International Journal of Nautical Archaeology, 5(2), 133-136.
- Nicolaou, K. (1977). Principal Acquisitions by the Cyprus Museums, 1969–76. Archaeological Reports, 23, 77-91.
- Nicolaou, K. (1982). The Mycenaeans in the East. Studies in the History and Archaeology of Jordan, 1, 121-126.
