= Andreas Dikigoropoulos =

Archaeologist

Andreas Ioannou Dikigoropoulos (Greek: Ανδρέας Ιωάννου Δικηγορόπουλος) was a Cypriot archaeologist specialising in the Byzantine period in Cyprus.

Dikigoropoulos graduated with a DPhil from Lincoln College, University of Oxford in 1961. He worked as Assistant Curator of the Cyprus Museum in the Department of Antiquities, Cyprus for over a decade until 1960. He conducted excavations at mainly Byzantine sites in Polis, Kharcha, the Acheiropoietos Monastery, Panagia Angeloktisti and Panagia Limeniotissa. In Salamis he carried out excavations at the Basilica of Saint Epiphanios between 1954 and 1959 and excavations at the Marble Forum together with Vassos Karageorghis. Additionally he excavated basilicas in Pegeia with Peter Megaw. After his departure from the Department of Antiquities in 1960 he went to London to study law and practiced as a barrister in Cyprus.

== Publications ==
- Dikigoropoulos, A. I. (1956). A Byzantine Hoard from Kharcha, Cyprus. Numismatic Chronicle, Sixth Series, 16, 255–265.
- Dikigoropoulos A. I. and Megaw, A. H. S. (1957) Early Glazed Pottery from Polis. Report of the Department of Antiquities, Cyprus, 1940–48, 77.
- Dikigoropoulos, A. (1958). The Political Status of Cyprus A.D. 648–965. Report of Department of Antiquities, Cyprus, 1940–1948, 94–114.
- Dikigoropoulos, A. I. (1961). Cyprus betwixt Greeks and Saracens, A.D. 647-965. Unpublished DPhil thesis. University of Oxford.
- Dikigoropoulos, A. (1964). The Constantinopolitan Solidi of Theophilus. Dumbarton Oaks Papers, 18, 353–361.
- Dikigoropoulos, A. (1965–66). The Church of Cyprus during the Period of Arab Wars A.D. 649–965, The Greek Orthodox Theological Review, 11(2), 152–158..
- Catling, H. W. & Dikigoropoulos, A. I. (1970). The Kornos Cave: an Early Byzantine Site in Cyprus, Levant, 2(1), 37–62.
- Δικηγορόπουλος, Α. (1970). «Η Κύπρος από το 642 ως το 965», Ιστορία του Ελληνικού Έθνους, τ. Η'. Αθήνα.
- Δικηγορόπουλος, Α. (Ιαν. - Ιουν. 1978). Γεωγραφικά Χρονικά. Η΄, 13, 3-14.

== See also ==
- Hector Catling
