= Tenta, Cyprus =

Aceramic Neolithic settlement

Tenta
- Tέντα (Greek)
- Kalavasos-Tenta or Tenda
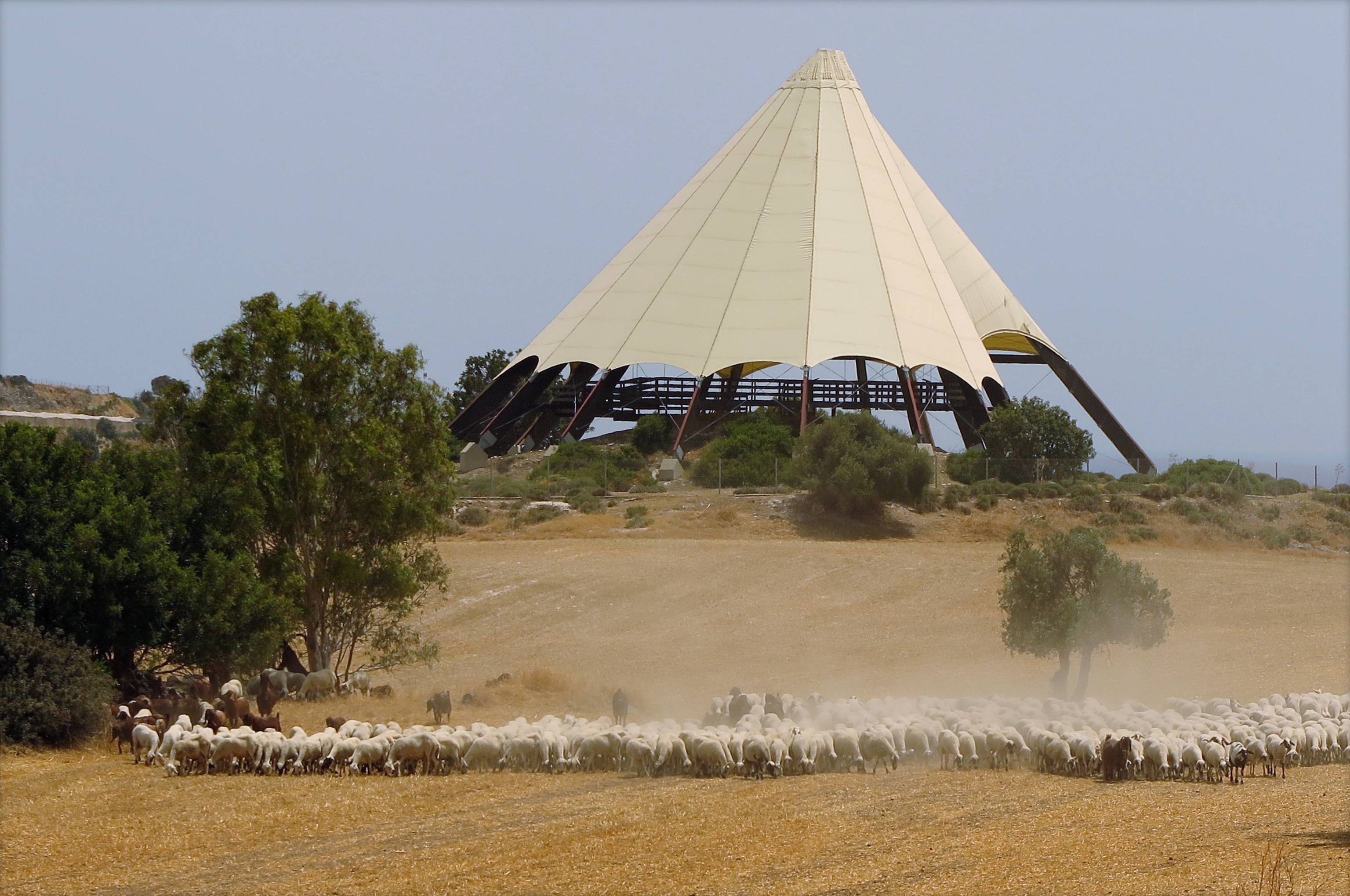
- View of Tenta (protective structure)

- Location within Cyprus
- 34°45′09″N 33°18′11″E
- Type: Settlement
- Periods: PPNB
- Cultures: Cypriote Aceramic Neolithic
- Location: Larnaca District, Cyprus

History
- Built: c. 8000 BC
- Abandoned: before 5000 BC

Site notes
- Excavation dates: 1947–1984
- Archaeologists: Porphyrios Dikaios, Ian A. Todd
- Discovered: 1940
- Management: Cyprus Department of Antiquities
- Public access: yes

Tenta, also referred to as Kalavasos-Tenta or Tenda, is an Aceramic Neolithic settlement located in modern Kalavasos near the southern coast of Cyprus. The settlement is approximately 38 kilometres southwest of Larnaca and approximately 45 kilometres south of Nicosia. Tenta occupies a small natural hill on the west side of the Vasilikos valley, close to the Nicosia–Limassol highway.

The earliest occupation at the site has been dated to around 8000 BC, which is contemporary with the sites Shillourokambos and Mylouthkia, and notably predating Khirokitia by almost a millennium. It was still settled during the 6th millennium BC, but deserted at some point before the advent of the Cypriotic Ceramic Neolithic.

Six seasons of excavation in Tenta occurred from 1947 to 1984. The obtained data is of interest to studies of cultural change in Prehistoric Cyprus because Tenta's architectural remains, artefacts, human burials, flora and fauna have been "virtually unchanged for two millennia, suggesting that there was considerable continuity in social organisation as well as technological and economic practices."

Today, the site is open to visitors (with entrance fee), and protected by a characteristic, modern cone-shaped roof. The roof is considered a local landmark, and the site a popular tourist attraction.

== Background and name ==
The Vasilikos valley is located in the Larnaca District of Cyprus. The valley was known to be abundant in archaeological sites from numerous extensive surveys conducted due to excavations of accidentally discovered sites; however these sites were widely scattered in Cyprus.

According to local tradition, the name of the location refers back to 327 AD when Saint Helena, mother of Constantine I, stayed there in a tent (Greek: Tέντα). Helena supposedly pitched her tent after walking up the Vasilikos valley (Greek: Βασιλικός), vasilikos meaning "royal place or land".

== Excavation history ==
The archaeological site of Tenta was first reported by Porphyrios Dikaios in 1940 when artefacts were discovered during the construction of a mining railway line. In 1947, Dikaios undertook a two-week archaeological excavation focused 25 metres south of the summit of Tenta. Eleven locals and several students from Brandeis University were employed to assist with the excavation. A detailed report of the excavation was never published, but a plan of the excavation was released in 1960, which showed a trench being excavated approximately five metres below and adjacent to a curvilinear wall.

Since many sites of Cyprus had only been fleetingly explored, Vassos Karageorghis, the Director of the Department of Antiquities of Cyprus, worked with Ian Todd, who had previously assisted in numerous excavations in Turkey and Iran, to direct the Vasilikos Valley project which included five seasons of excavation in Tenta between 1976 and 1984. The project was sponsored by Brandeis University and funded by the National Science Foundation.

To locate sites, Todd walked nineteen different transects across the valley from east to west – from the Kalavasos Dam to the coast. Each transect was positioned equidistant from each other. Problems of the archaeological field survey in Cyprus include erosion as many sites were situated on different gradients, which often affects the estimation of the size of a site as well as makes it more challenging for surveyors to find where artefacts are located. Furthermore, aggradation was also considered to be a potential problem impacting the discovery of sites due to the increase in land elevation.

Although the excavations ended in 1984, details about the findings were published as late as 2005.

== Architectural remains ==
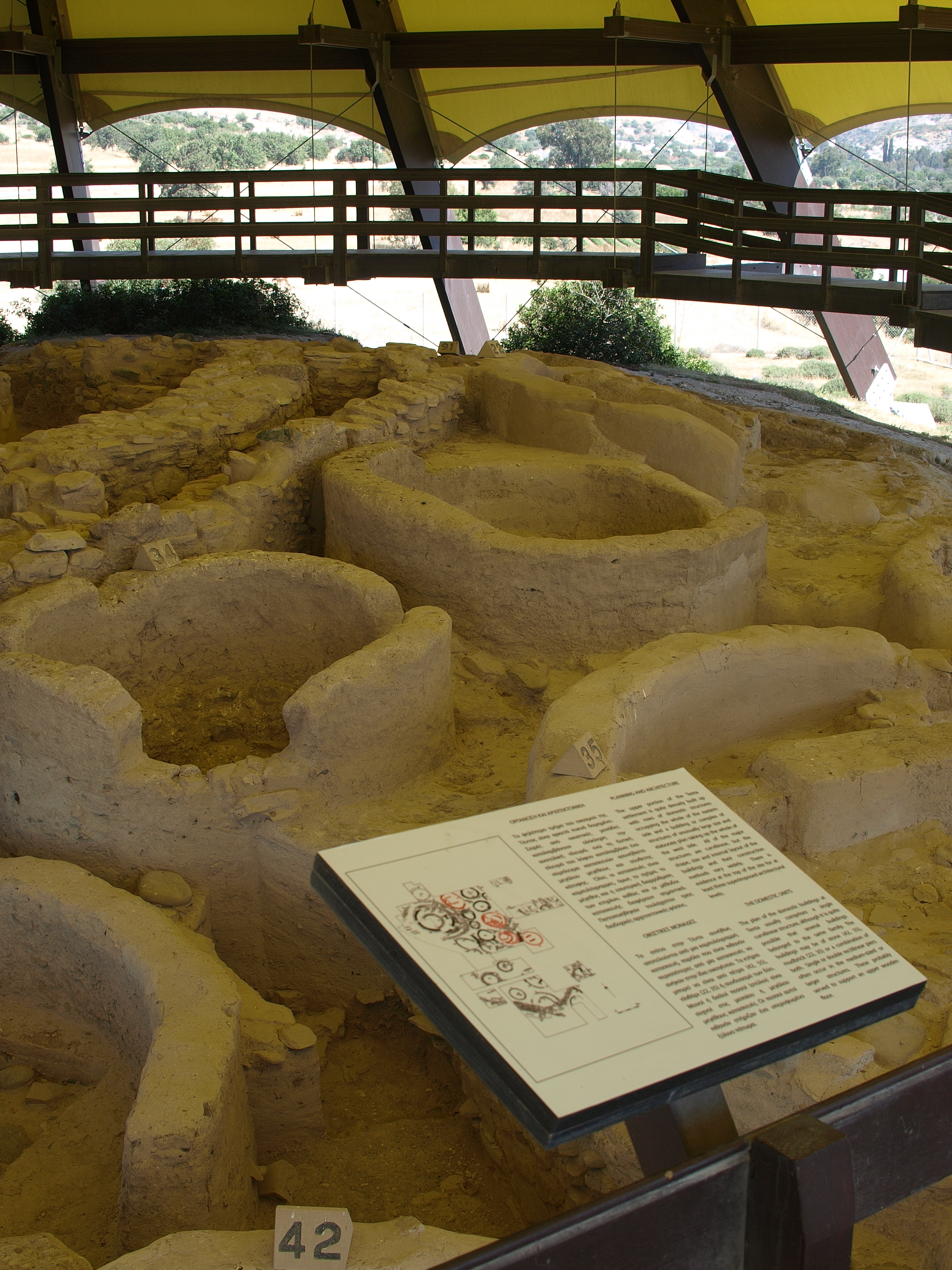
Neolithic architecture in Tenta, Cyprus

All structures discovered in Tenta are curvilinear and thus from the Aceramic Neolithic period due to neighbouring Neolithic settlements like Khirokitia exhibiting similar features. From the excavations, it was discovered that public buildings were constructed at the summit of Tenta's natural hill, "first in stone and mudbrick, then entirely in mudbrick and finally entirely in stone." Furthermore, homes at the site were unearthed to find that the stone structures were built of limestone with a mixture of diabase locally accessible in the Vasilikos river. The walls of the curvilinear structures stood to one metre or more in height and were determined to vary thickness between 25 and 60 centimetres as well as varied in colour including grey, reddish-brown, light brown, and dark brown. The floors and walls of the buildings were often made of gypsum, lime, or a combination of both as well as "coated with a thin, whitish plaster layer laid on a base of friable mud plaster". The stones of the buildings were predominately found to be laid neatly in parallel as well as had within them platforms, benches and seats. The flat as well as domed roofs of the buildings in Tenta were constructed from branches, reeds, and rammed earth and the surfaces of the walls of the buildings were often intricately decorated such as a "painting depicting two human figures with upraised hands." Furthermore, approximately 40 to 45 structures were excavated in total, and it was estimated that the population in Tenta never exceeded 150 people based on the size and shape of the structures.

== Artefacts ==
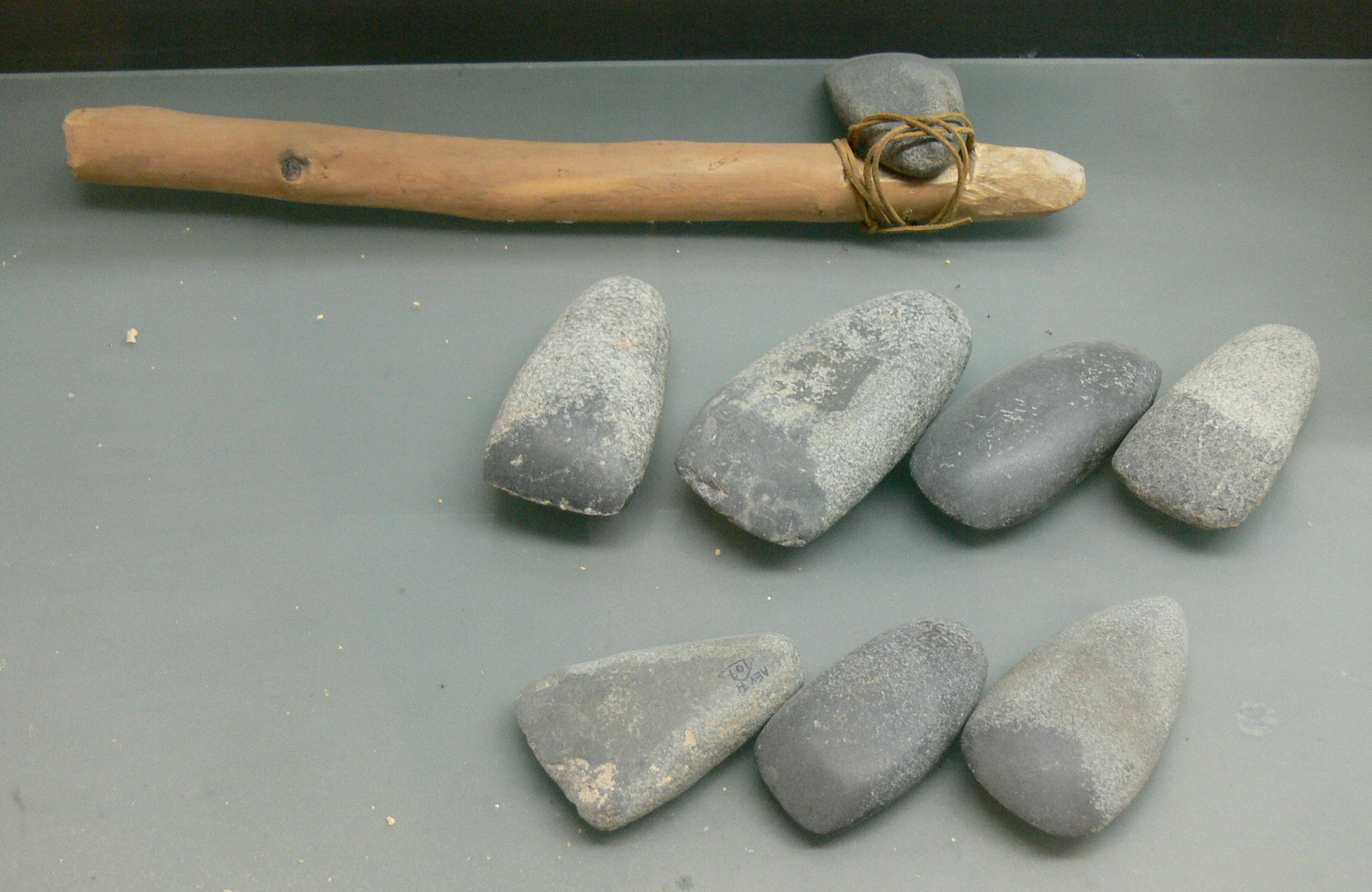
Neolithic stone axes similar to those found at Tenta (from Aghios Epiktitos Vrysi)

Approximately one thousand man-made artefacts crafted with stone, animal bone or shell were recovered from the Tenta excavations. The artefacts were found within and outside buildings as well as within soil deposits. All objects were retrieved using a sieve, which assisted in recovering many of the objects which were small and fragmented due to the rubbish that had enveloped them, especially in soil deposits. The artefacts found are predominantly from the Aceramic Neolithic period with the exception of two clay plugs, a characteristic of the Chalcolithic period, which were found in the wall of a building. Artefacts discovered on the settlement include stone vessels, axes, hammerstones, and chipped stone tools like blades. Furthermore, there is evidence of proficiency from the inhabitants of Tenta such as their complex shapes carved in stone vessels. Rare artefacts were also found inside the walls of structures "including pendants, beads, large arrowheads and ground-stone implements covered with ochre." Copious picrolite, a crystal varying from dark green to grey most commonly found in the Kouris Dam, was likely used by the villagers to make jewellery during the Aceramic Neolithic period. Furthermore, chert was used as a tool by the villagers of Tenta to break things by force as well as to start fires because sparks ignite easily when the rock is struck on a hard surface. A selection of artefacts are displayed in the Cyprus Museum and the Larnaca District Archaeological Museum.

== Human burials ==
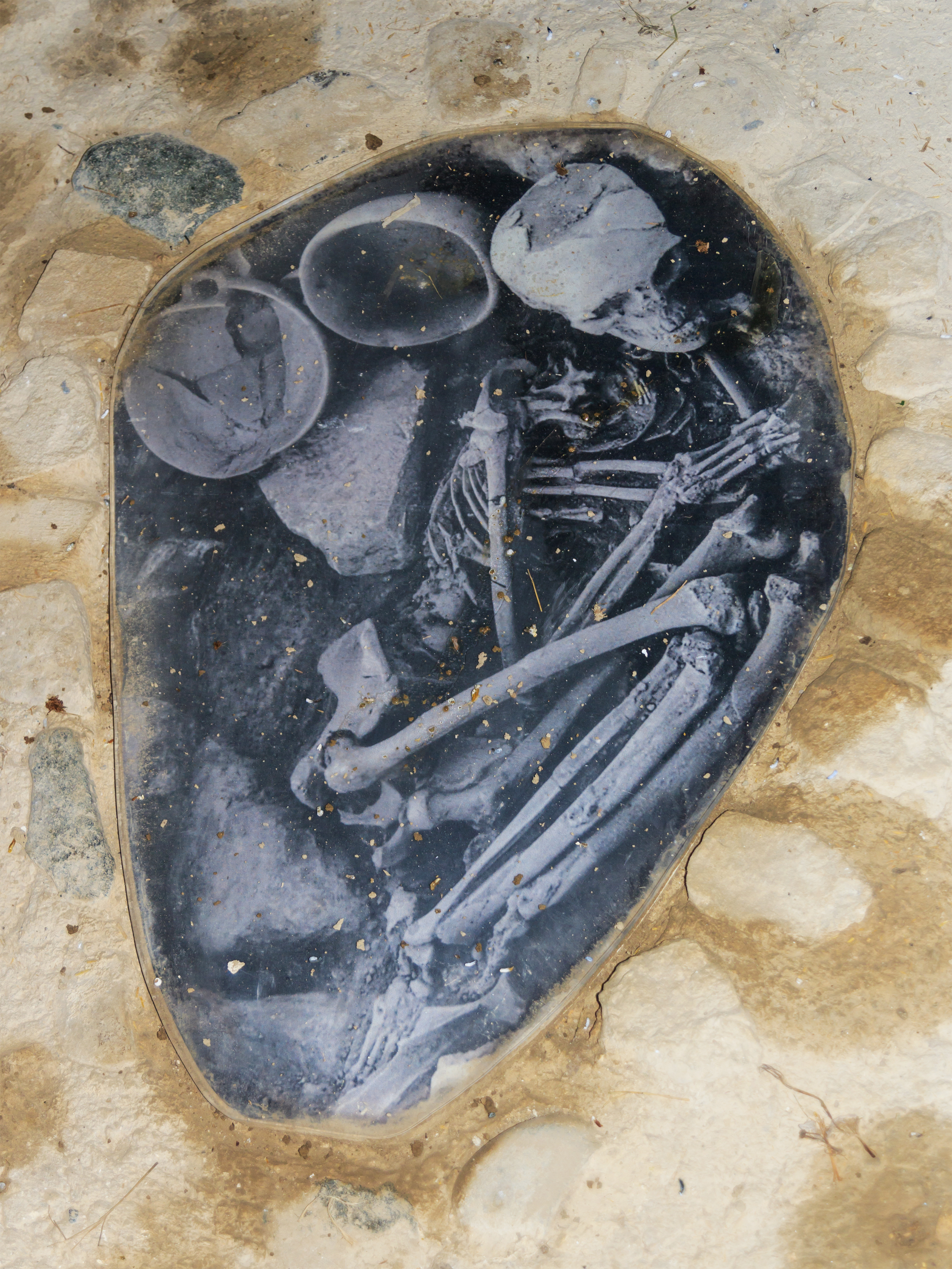
Burial in Neolithic settlements as found in Tenta (picture from nearby Khirokitia)

Fourteen human burials containing eighteen individuals were excavated at Tenta. The eighteen skeletons were buried in contracted positions and positioned to the internal house walls, within oval pits not accompanied with any gifts or offerings, just beneath the floors or outside the structures. The burials include adults, children and infants buried separately, except the remains of four infants buried together in one pit.

The average age at death for males and females was 30.5 years and 36.5 years respectively. This six-year gap between the sexes may be due to limitations of a small sample size as well as poor preservation and age averaging techniques, especially due to the differences in neighbouring Neolithic settlements in which the longevity of males is greater than females. Furthermore, the average height for males and females was 162.9 centimetres (5 ft 4.1 in) and 153.8 centimetres (5 ft 0.6 in), respectively. Analysis of the skeletons' teeth suggest that the inhabitants had generally good dental health as well as a diet sufficient in protein and carbohydrates. This is due to the inhabitants' main diet consisting of plants as well as domesticated or hunted animals like fallow deer, pig and cattle. Moreover, analysis of the eighteen skeletons determined that the inhabitants of Tenta may have suffered from hemolytic anemia and iron-deficiency anemia, as well as having practiced artificial cranial deformation due to 11.1% of them having their skulls bound. Such practices were also common in the neighbouring Neolithic settlement of Khirokitia, and also during later periods in Cyprus such as the Late Bronze Age.

== Botanical remains ==
The botanical remains from Tenta revealed the subsistence practices in the Aceramic Neolithic period. It was expected that the botanical remains of wheat, barley and various legumes would be found in Tenta based on the earlier excavations from the neighbouring Neolithic settlements of Kastros and Khirokitia. The remains were recovered using a froth flotation process designed by Anthony Legge. According to Todd, "[a]pproximately 10 litres of every excavated deposit were [...] examined and sorted under low power (10×–50×) magnification using a Bausch and Lomb stereo microscope." Components of the plant such as roots, stems and seeds were analysed separately and were compared with modern samples. Only 175 from the 416 botanical remains recovered via froth flotation contained carbon to analyse accurately. There was a smaller amount of carbonised remains to analyse compared to neighbouring Neolithic settlements due to the damage from excavating the remains with picks and trowels. From the 2074 litres sieved out of 7764 litres of carbonised botanical remains via froth flotation, it was discovered that "domesticated plants from the site consist of emmer and einkorn wheat, barley (probably two-row), lentil and possibly pea."

The distribution of botanical remains as well as the fire pits and hearths inside and outside the architectural remains were examined and compared to neighbouring Neolithic settlements. It was discovered that more hearths and fire pits were outside and between buildings than inside them, suggesting that the cooking in the period was conducted outside. Two hearths from the site revealed that civilians had gathered wild resources for cooking such as fig, pistachio, grape, olive and plum, but the analysis of the botanical remains did not indicate the specific cooking process or storage practices in the Aceramic Neolithic period.

== Faunal remains ==
From the excavations at Tenta, 2817 faunal bone fragments were recovered. As shown in the table below, the majority of bone fragments (99.7%) were from deer, pig and caprinae (sheep and goat), which highlights that the civilians of Tenta predominately surrounding these mammals coupled with the remaining 0.3% of fragments being cat, fox and rodent. From epiphyseal plate data obtained from the faunal remains, it was found that 72% of deer, 28% of pig, 60% of caprinae were culled as adults. A collection of antlers from deer were also found intact inside three buildings and believed to have been possibly showcased by villagers in Tenta as an achievement of their hunting.

The process of recovering the faunal remains involved sieving excavated deposits through all 1 cm, 5 mm and 3 mm meshes. Despite this high standard process of retrieving faunal remains, the bone fragments recovered were fragile and there was a high risk of the bone splitting, which resulted in many of the bones breaking and splintering. Thus, the veracity of any interpretation of the faunal remains may contribute to preservation bias during faunal assemblage. The range of animals recovered in the neighbouring Neolithic settlement of Khirokitia similarly was mostly deer, pig and caprinae with a small representation of cat, fox and rodent in the bone fragments. Hence, the same array of animals – based on the husbanding of pigs and caprines and the hunting of deer – provided the basis for subsistence economies in the Aceramic Neolithic period. The main aim of culling these animals for the Tenta and Khirokitia villagers was to consume their meat, but also most likely use their skin and bones for clothes and tools. Furthermore, cats and foxes were most likely to have been imported by colonists and used for their pelts as well as exterminators of vermin such as rodents.

Faunal bone fragments	Number	Percentage (%)
Deer	1095	38.9
Pig	924	32.8
Caprinae	789	28.0
Cat	4	0.1
Fox	3	0.1
Rodent	2	0.1

Numbers and percentages of identified faunal bone fragments from Tenta.

== Protective shelter ==
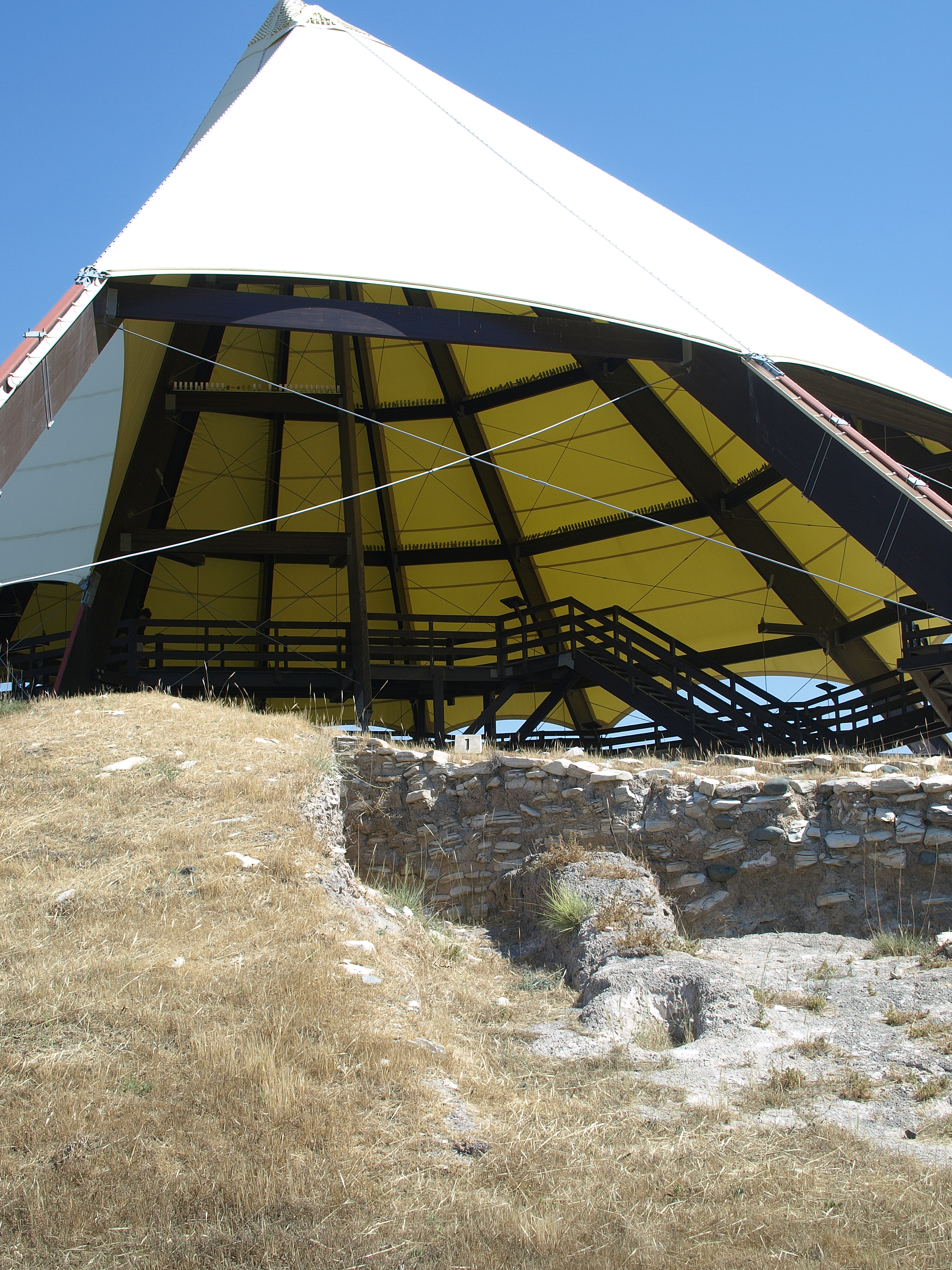
Protective shelter in Tenta, Cyprus

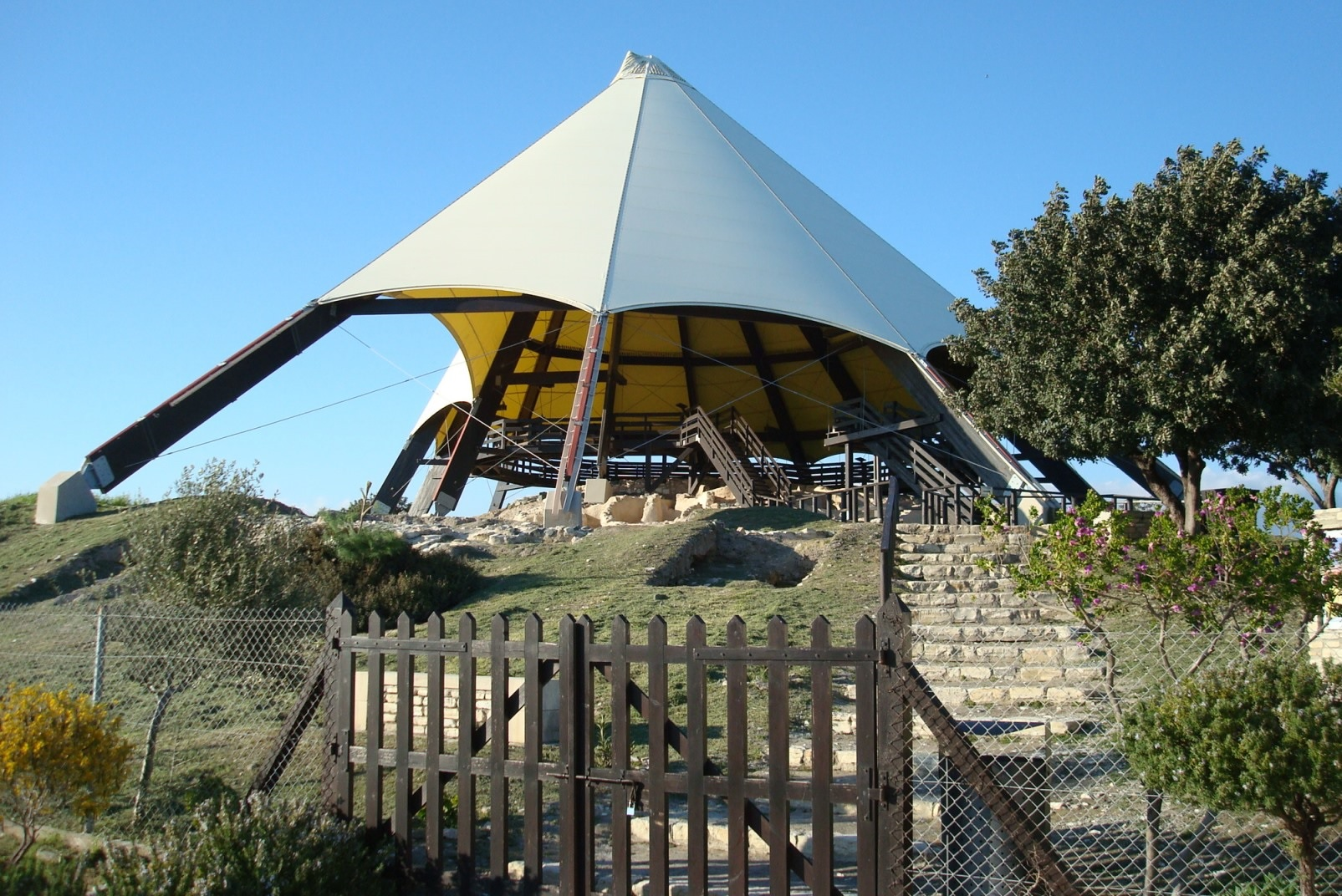
View of the protective tent and visitor path

In 1994 to 1995, Vassos Karageorghis commissioned and the Anastasios G. Leventis Foundation funded the construction of a tent-like conical or "pyramidal" structure that improved the protection of the remnants of Tenta from the elements. The shelter consists of glulam beams coated by a PVC membrane and cost US$340,000 over the two year construction phase. The structure has been called a local landmark.

Information board at the site
