= Sophocles Hadjisavvas =

Cypriot archaeologist

Sophocles Hadjisavvas (Greek: Σοφοκλής Χατζησάββας) (b. 1944) is a Cypriot archaeologist and director of the Department of Antiquities between 1998 and 2004.

== Early life and education ==
He was born in 1944 in Kakopetria and graduated from Pancyprian Gymnasium. Between 1965-1970 he studied archaeology and history at Sofia University. He continued his studies at Cambridge with the late Professor Colin Renfrew, and he specialized in Museum Studies at UCL with a UNESCO fellowship.

== Career ==
In 1973 he began working for the Department of Antiquities. From 1990 to 1997, he held the position of Curator of Monuments. In 1997 he succeeded Demos Christou in the position of the director of the Department, serving in that capacity until 2004. In his early years in the Department, he conducted survey work around Cyprus, especially in the districts of Famagusta and Kyrenia.

Hadjisavvas has conducted various excavations throughout the island, the most notable being the excavation of a Late Bronze Age, administrative complex, settlement and cemetery in the area of Alassa. Additionally, he conducted extensive excavations in the necropolis of Kition, between 1979 and 1984. Furthermore he conducted excavations at Paphos, starting in 1977 at the Tombs of the Kings, and later at Nicosia, and Ayia Napa.

He is notable for his extensive research on olive oil and wine presses discovered in Cyprus that date from the Bronze Age to the Late Roman period. He represented Cypriot archaeology in various international conferences, including at the Annual Meeting of the Archaeological Institute of America.

== Publications ==
- Χατζησάββας, Σ. (1991). Καταβολές - Η Αρχαιολογική Επισκόπηση 20 κατεχομένων σήμερα χωριών της Επαρχίας Αμμοχώστου.
- Hadjisavvas, S. (1992). Olive Oil Processing in Cyprus, from the Bronze Age to the Byzantine Period.
- Χατζησάββας, Σ. (1994). Σαλαμίνα: Πόλη και Νεκρόπολις.
- Hadjisavvas, S. (1997). Agia Napa. Excavations at Makronisos and the archaeolοgy of the region.
- Hadjisavvas, S. (2002). The contribution of the Late Cypriote economy to the emergence of kingship in Cyprus. Cahiers Du Centre d’Études Chypriotes, 53–58.
- Hadjisavvas, S. (2007). The Phoenician penetration in Cyprus as documented in the necropolis of Kition. Cahiers Du Centre d’Études Chypriotes, 185–195.
- Χατζησάββας, Σ. (2008). Η ελιά και το λάδι στον αρχαίο ελληνικό κόσμο.
- Hadjisavvas, S. (2012). The Phoenician Period Necropolis of Kition I. Nicosia: Department of Antiquities, Cyprus.
- Hadjisavvas, S. (2015). Perishing Heritage: The Case of the Occupied Part of Cyprus. Journal of Eastern Mediterranean Archaeology and Heritage Studies, 3(2), 128–140.
- Hadjisavvas, S. (2017). Alassa: Excavations at the Late Bronze Age Sites of Pano Mantilaris and Paliotaverna 1984-2000. Nicosia: Department of Antiquities.
- Hadjisavvas, S. (2023). The Archaeology of Wine in Cyprus. Nicosia. NAPAFOS Publications.
- Hadjisavvas, S. (2017). Digging up the Tombs of the Kings, a World Heritage Site (Guidebook 3rd edition). Nicosia.
- Hadjisavvas, S. (2016). “Perishing Heritage: The Case of the Occupied Part of Cyprus”. In JEMAHS 3.2_03_Forum, Journal of Eastern Mediterranean Archaeology and Heritage Studies. Philadelphia 2016. 128-141.
- Hadjisavvas, S. (2014). The Phoenician Period Necropolis of Kition Vol. II. Nicosia.
- Hadjisavvas, S. (2010). (Ed.) Cyprus: Crossroads of Civilizations. Republic of Cyprus. Nicosia
- Χατζησάββας, Σ. (1998). «Μακεδονία-Κύπρος. Από τον Αλέξανδρο ως τη Ρωμαϊκή Κατάκτηση», in Παναγιώτου, Ν. (ed.) Κύπρος και Μακεδονία. Σχέσεις μέσα στο χρόνο. Λευκωσία. 13-65.
- Hadjisavvas, S. (2021). Ευέλαιος Κύπρος: The Olive and Olive Oil in Cyprus, from Antiquity to Industrialization. Nicosia. The A. G. Leventis Foundation.
