= Tombs of the Kings (Paphos) =

Ancient burial site in Cyprus

UNESCO World Heritage Site
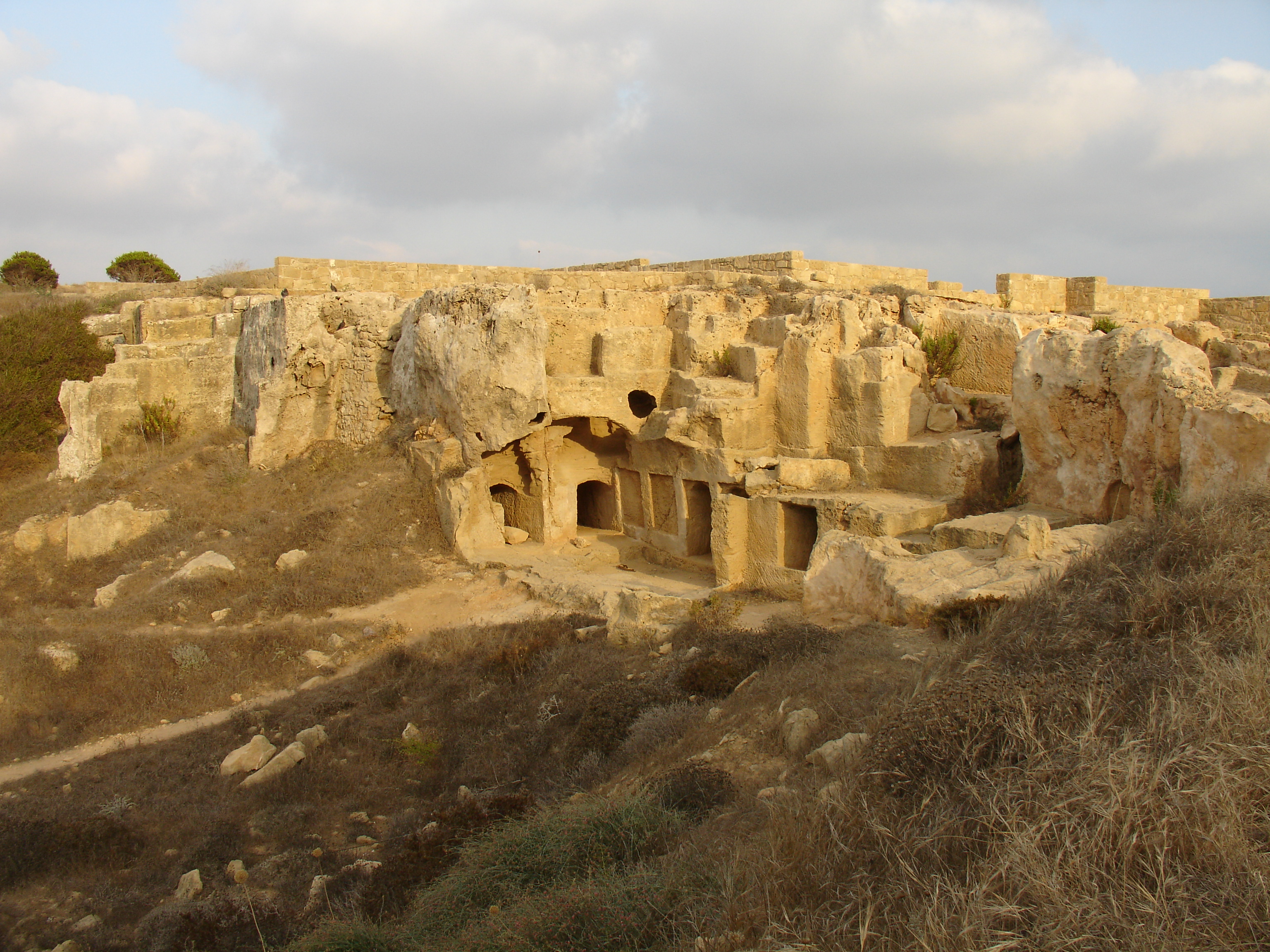
- One of the numerous excavated sites at the Tombs of the Kings

- Location within Cyprus
- Official name: Kato Paphos necropolis (Tafoi ton Vasileon)
- Location: Paphos, Paphos District, Cyprus
- Part of: Paphos
- Criteria: Cultural: (iii)(vi)
- Reference: 79-002
- Inscription: 1980 (4th Session)
- Area: 32.6883 ha (80.775 acres)
- Coordinates: 34°46′30″N 32°24′25″E

The Tombs of the Kings (Greek: Τάφοι των Βασιλέων [ˈtafi ton vasiˈleon], Turkish: Kral Mezarları) is a large necropolis about 2 kilometres (1.2 mi) north of Paphos harbour in Cyprus. In 1980, it was designated a UNESCO World Heritage Site along with Nea Paphos in modern Paphos and Palaepahos in modern Kouklia.

The underground tombs, many of which date back to the 4th century BC, are carved out of solid rock, and are thought to have been the burial sites of Paphian aristocrats and high officials up to the 3rd century AD (the name comes from the magnificence of the tombs; no kings were buried here). Some of the tombs feature Doric columns and frescoed walls. Archaeological excavations are still being carried out at the site. The tombs are cut into the native rock, and at times imitated the houses of the living.

The tombs have been known and casually explored for centuries. The oldest modern account was written by Richard Pockocke, in 1783. Almost a century later, in 1870 the first archaeological excavations were conducted by Luigi Palma di Cesnola, the American consul to Cyprus. In 1915 the first excavations under scientific supervision took place, led by Menelaos Markides, the curator of the Cyprus Museum. Systematic excavations took place in the late 1970s and the 1980s under the direction of Sophocles Hadjisavvas, former director of the Department of Antiquities of Cyprus.

Dr Hadjisavvas has completed the first volume of the final publication report under the title: Tombs of the Kings, The Ptolemaic Necropolis of Pafos, Volume 1, Excavation Seasons 1977-1981, published by the Cyprus Department of Antiquities. The publication focuses on the connection of Tomb 8 to the Ptolemaic dynasty, more concretely to the burial of the last king of Cyprus, who committed suicide after the Romans occupied the island. Part of the importance of the tombs lies in the Paphian habit of including Rhodian amphorae among the offerings in a burial. Through the manufacturing stamps placed on the handles of these amphorae, it is possible to give them a date and, through them, the other material from the same burial.

Thus, it is hoped to develop a more secure chronology for archaeological material in the Eastern Mediterranean of the Hellenistic and early Roman periods.

It is reported that much of the information related to the tombs was lost over time. Several factors contributed to that: It is believed that many of the tombs were rich in expensive grave goods, even though very few of such goods were found by the official archaeological missions, and thus it is believed that grave robbers were responsible. Also, the tombs’ proximity to the seaside hindered the preservation of the buried bodies. Despite these obstacles, the historical significance of the tombs is well established among experts and locals.

== Gallery ==
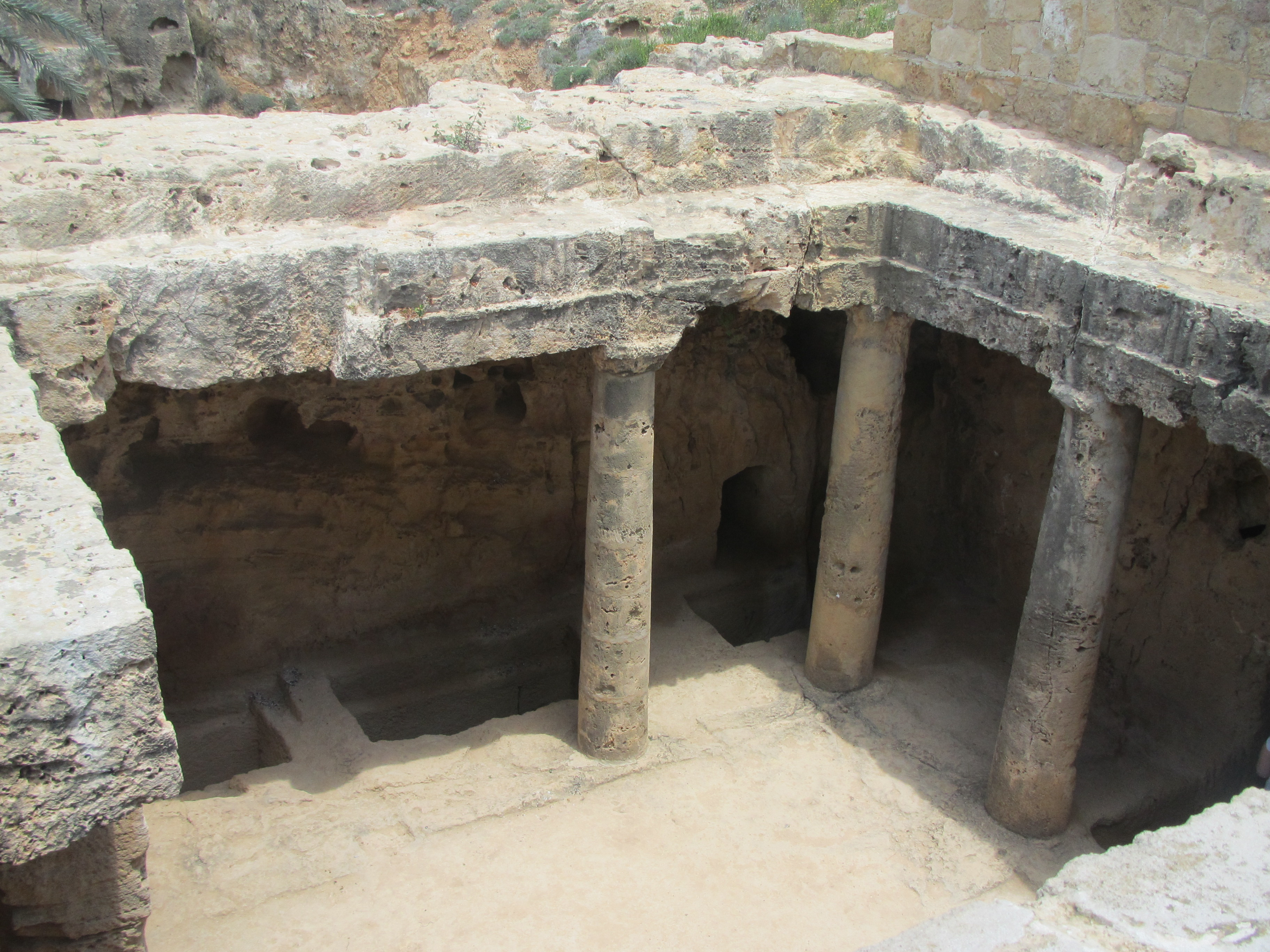

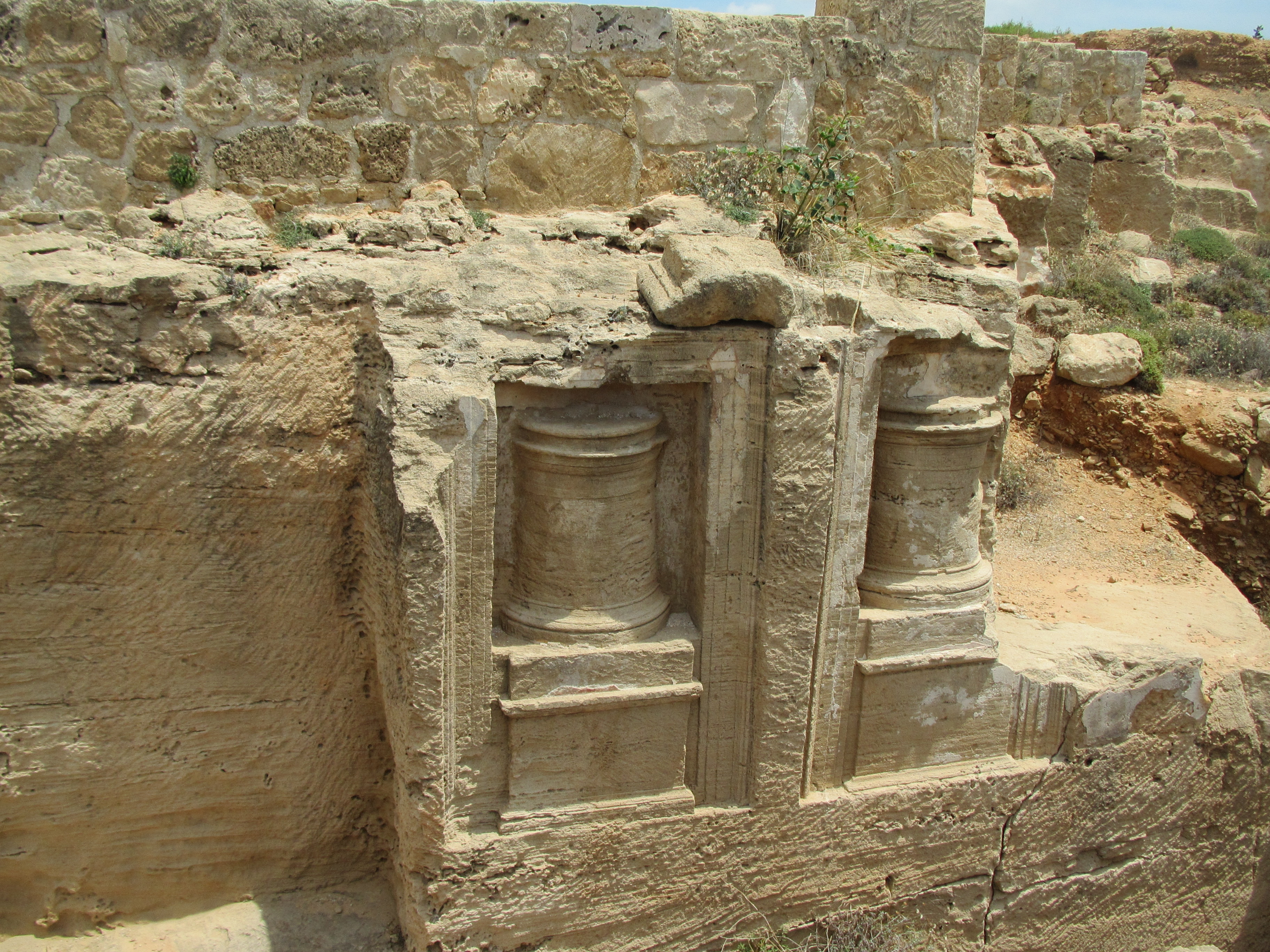

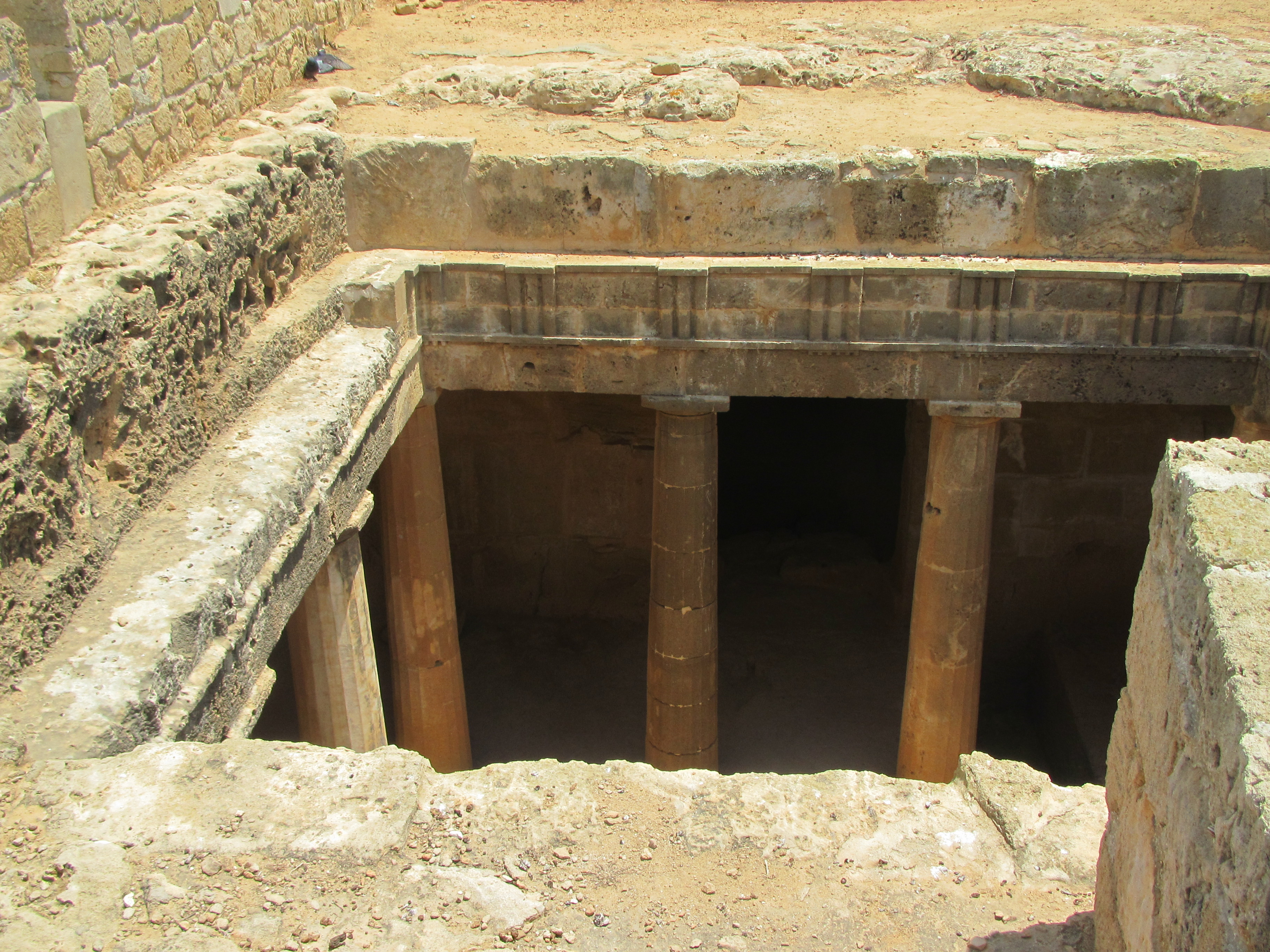

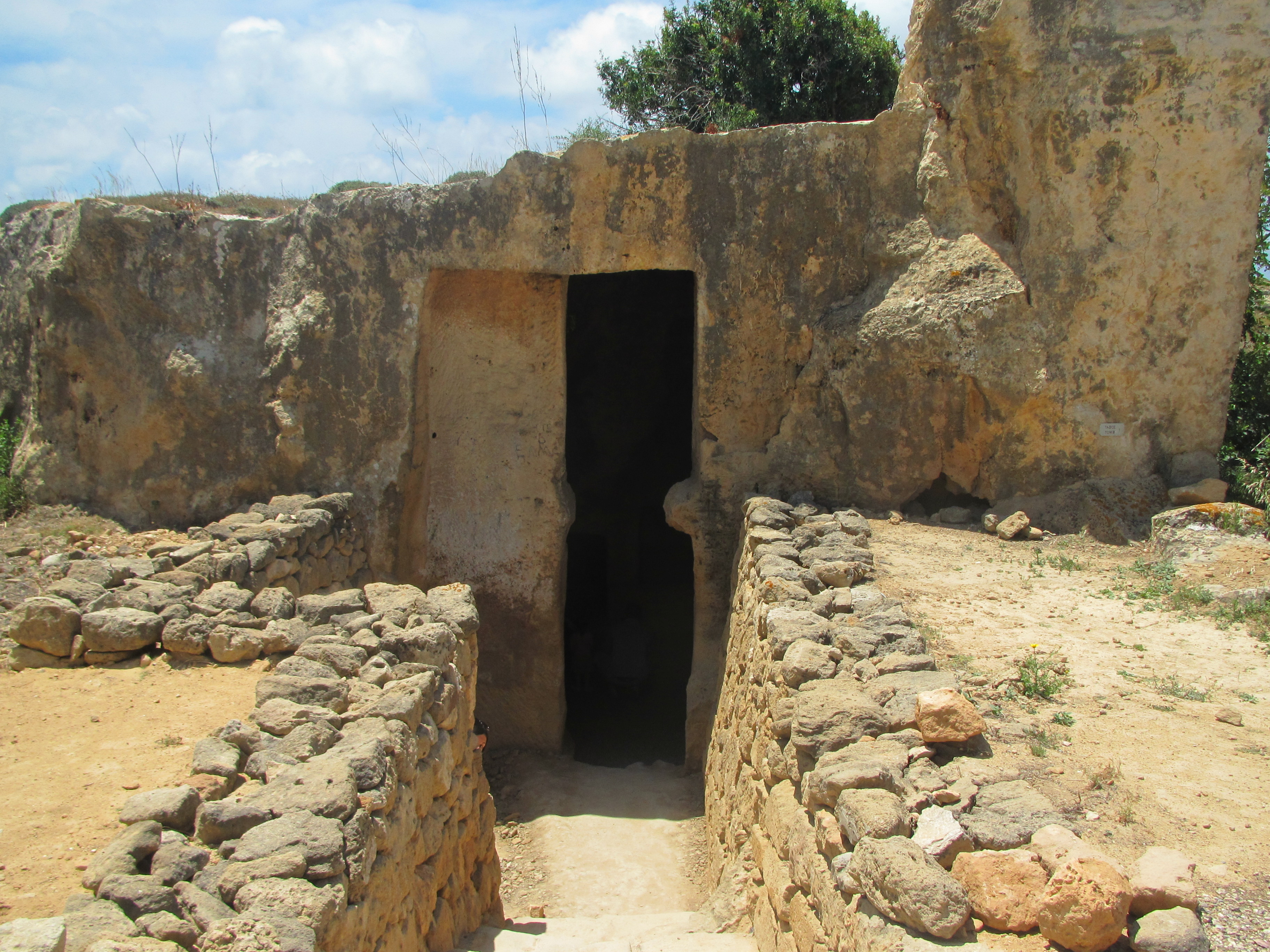

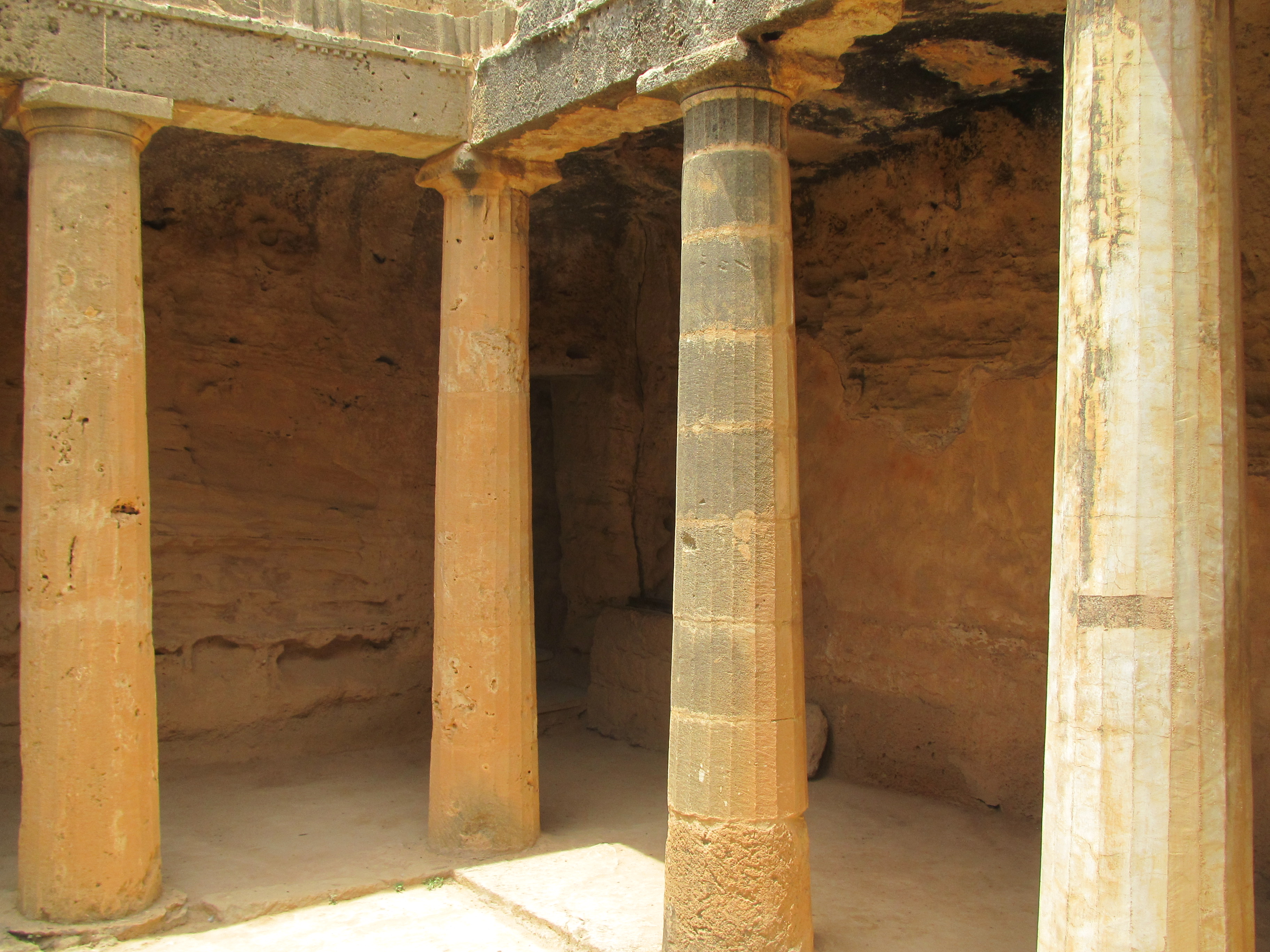

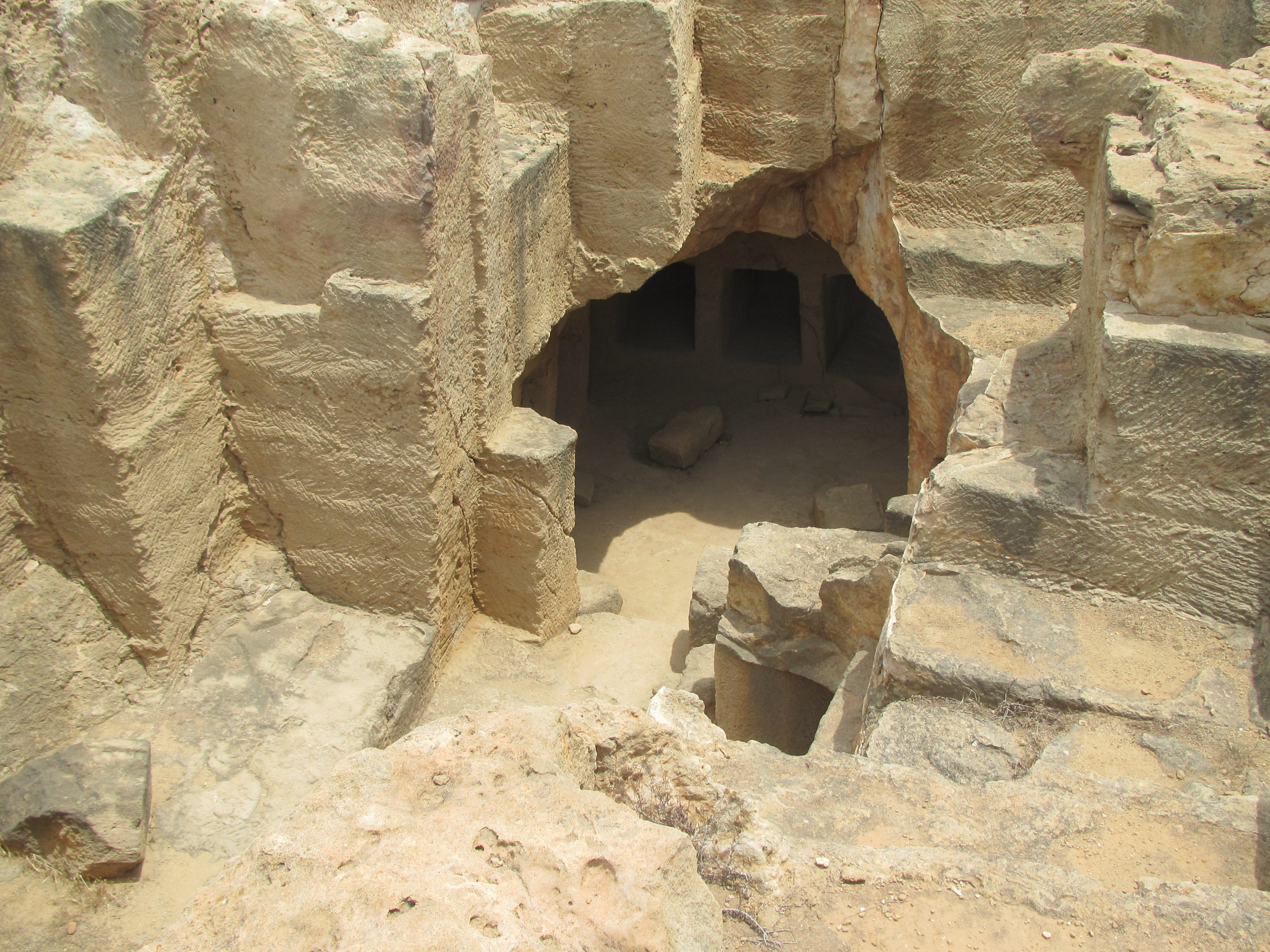
