= Pavlos Flourentzos =

Cypriot archaeologist

Pavlos Flourentzos FSA (Greek: Παύλος Φλουρέντζος) (Famagusta, 1947 - 23 July 2023) was a Cypriot archaeologist who served as the director of the Department of Antiquities from 2004 until 2009.

== Early life and education ==
Flourentzos was born in Famagusta in 1947. He graduated from Charles University with an MA in Classical Archaeology and History of Art and a PhD in Classical Archaeology.

== Professional career ==
He worked in the Department of Antiquities from 1973 until his retirement in 2009, first as an archaeological officer, then from 1993 to 2004 as Curator of Museums and Surveys, and finally serving as the Director from 2004 until 2009. In his capacity as Curator of Museums he organised many exhibitions at the Cyprus Museum and participated in exhibitions of Cypriot antiquities abroad. Additionally, he acted as the secretary of the Cypriot Committee to ICOM and in 1992 he was honoured by the Faculty of Letters of the University of Athens for his contributions to Cypriot letters. Since 1994 he had been a member of the Society of Antiquaries of London and from 2005 a corresponding member of the German Archaeological Institute.

=== Excavations and research ===
Between 1986 and 1990 he conducted rescue excavations of tombs near the villages of Kantou, Alassa and Agios Athanasios. In 2005 he conducted a surface survey at the Prehistoric site of Stroumpi-Pigi-Agios Andronikos in collaboration with Albert J. Ammerman (Colgate University). The same team also conducted an underwater survey at the pre-Neolithic site of Akamas-Aspros in 2007. Additionally, the same team excavated the Neolithic site of Paralimni-Nissia.

Flourentzos' most notable systematic excavations were in the lower town of the Iron Age city-kingdom of Amathus, that lasted between 1991 and 2009. His work in Amathus has contributed to the understanding of the influence of the Egyptian religion and the Ptolemaic dynasty in Hellenistic Amathus. Furthermore he uncovered the occupational phases of the Roman and Early Byzantine Amathus. He collaborated frequently with French archaeologist, Pierre Aupert, for the publication of inscriptions from Amathus.

His researcher covered a wide chronological range from Prehistory until the Medieval period. He published excensively on the subject of figurines and religious cults in ancient Cyprus.

== Publications ==
- Flourentzos, P. (1973). Kyperské archaické terakoty a jejich vztahy k okolním zemím. Listy Filologické / Folia Philologica, 96(3), 138–145. http://www.jstor.org/stable/23459092
- Flourentzos, P. (1976). Two figurines of the Aphrodite—Astarte type in the Limasol District Museum. Listy Filologické / Folia Philologica. 99 (2), 65-66.
- Φλουρέντζος, Π. (1977). Τα Τσέχικα Οδοιπορικά της Αναγέννησης και η Κύπρος.
- Flourentzos, P. (1978). The so-called "Cypriot pin" in the Near East and Europe. Archeologické rozhledy 30, 408–419.
- Flourentzos, P. (1988). Tomb discoveries from the Necropolis of Agia Paraskevi, Nicosia. Report of the Department of Antiquities, Cyprus, 121–25.
- Flourentzos, P. (1991). Excavations in the Kouris Valley, Vol. I: The Tombs. Nicosia: Republic of Cyprus, Ministry of Communication and Works, Department of Antiquities.
- Φλουρέντζος, Π. (1994). Η Θεά με τα υψωμένα χέρια στην Ευρώπη και στην Ανατολική Μεσόγειο. Archaeologia Cypria III, 86-92.
