= Demos Christou =

Cypriot archaeologist (1937–2025)

Demos Christou (Greek: Δήμος Χρήστου,1937 – 2 March 2025) was a Cypriot archaeologist and Director of the Department of Antiquities from 1991 to 1997.

== Early life and education ==
He was born in the village of Galini. He graduated from Morphou Gymnasium and then studied history and archaeology at the National and Kapodistrian University of Athens, and continued his studies at the UCL Institute of Archaeology and the École du Louvre. In 1997 he earned his doctoral degree from the National and Kapodistrian University of Athens with a dissertation on the funerary architecture of tombs dating to the Cypro-Archaic period.

== Career ==
In 1975 Christou began working as an Assistant Archaeological Officer at the Department of Antiquities. In 1979 he was tasked with heading a newly created section of the Department that focused on traditional architecture and folk art. He become the Director in 1991, succeeding Athanasios Papageorgiou. He conducted extensive excavations at the Iron Age city-kingdom of Kourion between 1975 and 1998. At Kourion, Christou discovered the forum of the city, and a possible basilica with a nymphaeum. In 1978 he conducted a minor survey that remains unpublished. in 1972 he conducted a brief excavation at Khirokoitia and a rescue excavations at the Chalcolithic cemetery at Souskiou-Vathirkakas. He excavated the cemetery at Vathirkakas again in the 90's, and subsequently participated in the final publication of the cemetery together with prominent Prehistorians like Diane Bolger, Paul Croft, Carole McCartney, Edgar Peltenburg and Andrew Shortland.

Christou died on 2 March 2025, at the age of 87–88.

== Publications ==
- Christou, D. (1985). Anavargos, archaeological site. Great Cypriot Encyclopedia, 2, 133-134.
- Christou, D. (1994). Kourion: a complete guide to its monuments and local museum. Filokipros Publications.
- Christou, D. (1996). Chronique des fouilles et découvertes archéohgiques à Chypre en 1995. Bulletin de Correspondance Hellénique, 120(2), 1051-1100.
- Χρήστου, Δ. (1996). Κυπρο-Αρχαϊκή Μνημειακή Ταφική Αρχιτεκτονική. Λευκωσία: Τμήμα Αρχαιοτήτων, Κύπρου.
- Χρήστου, Δ. (2013). Ανασκαφές Κουρίου 1975-1998. Τόμοι Α-Β. Nicosia: Department of Antiquities, Cyprus.
