= Maria Hadjicosti =

Cypriot archaeologist (born 1949)

Maria Hadjicosti (Greek: Μαρία Χατζηκωστή; born 1949) is a Cypriot archaeologist who served as the Director of the Department of Antiquities, Cyprus from 2009 until 2013, she was the first female director of the department.

She has an M.A. in Classical Archaeology and History and a PhD from Charles University. Hadjicosti was Curator of Antiquities and later became the Director of the Department of Antiquities in 2009 until her retirement in 2013. She conducted systematic excavations at the Iron Age city-kingdom of Idalion since 1991, as well as rescue excavations of Iron Age tombs in Agioi Omologites, Mari, Mathiatis and an Early Byzantine basilica at Pyla-Koutsopetria. Her excavation at Idalion was opened to visitors as a restored archaeological site with a museum in 2017.

== Publications ==
- Χατζηκωστή, Μ. (1987). Ναοί και ιερά της θεάς Aφροδίτης στην Kύπρο (μαρτυρίες αρχαίων ελληνικών πηγών και αρχαιολογικής έρευνας). Αρχαιολογία, 23, 48–51.
- Hadjicosti, M. (1995). Excavations at Idalion (1991-1995). Cahiers du Centre d'Études Chypriotes, 24, 25–28.
- Hadjicosti, M. (1997). The Kingdom of Idalion in the Light of New Evidence. Bulletin of the American Schools of Oriental Research, 308, 49–63.
- Hadjicosti, M. (2004). Idalion: New evidence for the Archaic-Classical kingdom and the Phoenician domination. Cahiers du Centre d'Études Chypriotes, 34, 83.
