= Michalis Loulloupis =

Cypriot archaeologist (born 1932)

Michalis Loulloupis (Greek: Μιχάλης Λουλλουπής; born 1932) was a Cypriot archaeologist working for the Department of Antiquities, Cyprus.

== Early life and education ==
Louloupis was born in Limassol in 1932, he studied History and Archaeology at the University of Athens and continued his studies at Lincoln College, Oxford. He followed postgraduate studies on prehistoric archaeology and did classes on museology and artefact conservation at the University of London.

== Career ==
He worked as a teacher in secondary education. He was then appointed at the Department of Antiquities in the position of Curator of Museums and Survey (Έφόρος Αρχαιολογικών Μουσείων και Επισκοπήσεως). Louloupis conducted a number of excavations, mainly at the sites of Amathus and Kourion. For a short period from 1991 to 1992 he was appointed director of the Department of Antiquities, before retiring.

He was in the board of directors of the Cypriot Theater Organisation (Θεατρικός Οργανισμός Κύπρου), 1983-1988, 1994-1997, 1997-2000.

== Publications ==
- Loulloupis, M. (1967). An Archaic and Classical tomb at Kornos. Report of the Department of Antiquities Cyprus, 1967, 126–167.
- Loulloupis, M. (1975). Excavations at Amathus. Annual Report of the Department of Antiquities, Cyprus, 29–39.
- Loulloupis, M. C. (1986). Mosaic Representations with Gladiatorial Games from Kourion. In V. Karageorghis (Ed.), Acts of the International Archaeological Symposium" Cyprus between the Orient and the Occident," Nicosia, 8-14 September 1985 (pp. 471–472). Department of Antiquities, Cyprus.
- Loulloupis, M. C. (1989). Hunting scenes on Cypriot vases of the Geometric period. Early Society in Cyprus, 171–179.
- Loulloupis, M. C. (1989). A rural cult place in the Soloi area. Cyprus and the East Mediterranean in the Iron Age, Ed. V. Tatton-Brown. London: British Museum, 68–83.
