= Athanasios Papageorgiou (archaeologist) =

Cypriot archaeologist and director (1931–2022)

Athanasios Papageorgiou (1931 - 26 July 2022) was a Cypriot archaeologist and director of the Department of Antiquities between 1989-1991.

== Early life, education and career ==
He was born in the village of Palaikythro, his father was a priest Papa-Georgios Athanasiou and his mom Chrystallou Papanastasiou. He graduated from Pancyprian Gymnasium in 1949. He studied theology at the National and Kapodistrian University of Athens from 1949 to 1954.

Upon coming to Cyprus he worked as a teacher of classics and theology in public schools. In 1955 he joined EOKA and was the connection between Archbishop Makarios III and Georgios Grivas. After the end of the struggle in 1959 and the creation of the Republic of Cyprus in 1960 he went to Paris for graduate studies on Byzantine history and art. He studied at École Pratique des Hautes Études, in the Faculté des Lettres of the University of Paris and at the Collège de France, under various prominent scholars like André Grabar and Paul Lemerle.

In 1962 he became Curator of Monuments, and in 1989 director of the Department of Antiquities, succeeding Vassos Karageorghis, until his retirement in 1991. He excavated a number of sites such as the basilicas of Marathovouno, Agia Triada in Gialousa and the Limeniotissa and Agia Kyriaki in Paphos, and contributed greatly to the study of Cypriot ecclesiastical architecture of the Late Antique and Byzantine periods. Additionally he worked extensively on the religious paintings in Cyprus and the Eastern Mediterranean during the Middle Byzantine and Frankish periods and to repatriate Byzantine art that was illegally exported from Cyprus after the Turkish Invasion of 1974. He published a number of churches of the 13th century. He was one of the founding members of the Byzantinist Society of Cyprus. A conference was organised in his honour in 2012 at the University of Cyprus.

== Publications ==
- Σύντομη Ἱστορία τῆς Ὀρθοδόξου Ἐκκλησίας τῆς Κύπρου, Λευκωσία, 1962.
- Εἰσαγωγή στή Βυζαντινή ζωγραφική, Λευκωσία, 1965.
- Ἡ Παλαιοχριστιανική καί Βυζαντινή Τέχνη τῆς Κύπρου, Λευκωσία, 1966.
- Masterpieces of the Byzantine Art of Cyprus, Nicosia, 1965.
- Icones de Chypre, Geneve, 1969.
- Οἱ ξυλόστεγοι ναοί τῆς Κύπρου, Λευκωσία, 1975.
- «Βυζαντινές εἰκόνες τῆς Κύπρου», Κατάλογος Ἐκθέσεως Βυζαντινῶν εἰκόνων τῆς Κύπρου, στο Μουσείο Μπενάκη, Αθήνα, 1976.
- Οἱ Βυζαντινές εἰκόνες τῆς Κύπρου.
- The Church of Panagia at Trikomo and its frescoes.
