= Andrew Shortland =

Academic background
- Education: University of Oxford
- Thesis: Vitreous materials at Amarna : the production of glass and faience in 18th Dynasty Egypt

Academic work
- Discipline: archaeology
- Institutions: Cranfield University; Ministry of Defence

Andrew J. Shortland is an archaeologist at Cranfield University where he is director of the Cranfield Forensic Institute (CFI), a position he has held since 2016.

Shortland established the Centre for Archaeological and Forensic Analysis at Cranfield in 2005 after having worked in the Ministry of Defence for six years.

== Life ==
=== Education ===
Shortland earned a BA in Geology at the University of Oxford. He holds a PhD from the University of Oxford with his dissertation: Vitreous materials at Amarna : the production of glass and faience in 18th Dynasty Egypt.

== Works ==
=== Thesis ===
- Shortland, Andrew J. (2000). Vitreous materials at Amarna: the production of glass and faience in 18th Dynasty Egypt. Vol. 827. British Archaeological Reports Limited. ISBN 9781841710389. OCLC 468225085.

=== Books ===
As author

- Shortland, Andrew J. (2008). Production Technology of Faience and Related Early Viteous. Monograph (University of Oxford. School of Archaeology). Oxford University School of Archaeology. ISBN 9781905905126.
- Shortland, Andrew J. (2012). Lapis Lazuli from the Kiln: Glass and Glassmaking in the Late Bronze Age. Studies in archaeological science: Leuven Univ. Press; Studies in archaeological sciences. Vol. 2. Leuven University Press. ISBN 9789058676917.

As editor

- Andrew J. Shortland, ed. (2001). The Social Context of Technological Change: Egypt and the Near East, 1650-1550 BC: Proceedings of a Conference Held at St. Edmund Hall, Oxford 12-14 September 2000. Oxbow. ISBN 9781842170502.
- C. Bronk Ramsey; Andrew J. Shortland, eds. (2013). Radiocarbon and the Chronologies of Ancient Egypt. Oxford, UK: Oxbow Books. ISBN 9781782970576. OCLC 881317968.
- Sonia Zakrzewski; Andrew Shortland; Joanne Rowland, eds. (21 December 2015). Science in the Study of Ancient Egypt. New York: Routledge. doi:10.4324/9781315678696. ISBN 9781315678696.
