= Enkomi =

Enkomi: Έγκωμη (Greek); Tuzla (Turkish)
- Enkomi in Cyprus.
- Coordinates: 35°9′30″N 33°53′28″E
- Country (de jure): Cyprus
  - District: Famagusta District
- Country (de facto): Northern Cyprus
  - District: Gazimağusa District

Population (2011)
  - Total: 2,645

Enkomi (Greek: Έγκωμη; Turkish: Tuzla) is a village near Famagusta in Cyprus. It is a short distance from a prominent 2nd millennium BC archaeological site also named Enkomi. Enkomi is under the de facto control of Northern Cyprus.

In 1974, Enkomi had about 800 Greek Cypriot inhabitants. They all fled to the south of the island after the Turkish invasion of Cyprus, in the aftermath of the July coup. As of 2011, Enkomi has a population of 2,645. It comprises displaced Turkish Cypriots from Larnaca and Turkish settlers from Adana Province and Trabzon Province.
