= Porphyrios Dikaios =

Greek Cypriot archaeologist (1904–1971)

Porphyrios Dikaios FSA
- Πορφύριος Δίκαιος
- Born: 16 August 1904; Nicosia, British Cyprus
- Died: 23 August 1971 (aged 67); Nicosia, Cyprus
- Education: University of Athens; British School at Athens; University of Liverpool; University of Lyon; University of Sorbonne
- Known for: Philia culture
- Scientific career
- Fields: Archaeology

Porphyrios Dikaios (Greek: Πορφύριος Δίκαιος) FSA (Nicosia, 16 August 1904 – 23 August 1971) was a Cypriot archaeologist.

== Early life and education ==
Porphyrios was born in Nicosia and graduated from the Pancyprian Gymnasium. He studied archaeology in the National and Kapodistrian University of Athens, in the British School at Athens (1924–1925) and the University of Liverpool (1925–1926). He interrupted his studies in Liverpool and continued at the University of Lyon and finally at the University of Sorbonne where he graduated in 1929.

== Career ==
After returning to Cyprus he was assigned at the age of 25 to the position of Assistant Curator of the Cyprus Museum (1929–1931) and a year later he started his own excavation work. He became Curator of the Cyprus Museum (1931–1960) and finally Director of the Department of Antiquities (1960–1963) after the independence of Cyprus from Britain. He conducted excavation work at Bellapais-Vounous (1931), in the Neolithic site of Khoirokitia, in the Chalcolithic site of Erimi (1933–1935), the Bronze Age site of Enkomi, as well as Sotira (1934) and Salamis, and identified the Philia culture; his work focused on Prehistoric Cyprus. He retired from the Department in 1963 and traveled to the United States where he taught at the University of Princeton and Brandeis University. In 1966 he moved to Heidelberg where he taught at the University of Heidelberg as a professor of Near Eastern archaeology until the end of his life.

== Legacy ==
In 2015 he was commemorated by a stamp from the Cyprus post.

== Publications ==
- Dikaios, P. (1932). Les Cultes Préhistoriques dans l'ile de Chypre. Syria, 13(4), 345–354. http://www.jstor.org/stable/4389856
- Dikaios, P. (1933). Ploughing in Cyprus in the Early Bronze Age. Man, 33, 132–33. https://doi.org/10.2307/2790198.
- Dikaios, P. (1934). Cyprus Museum Excavations. Antiquity, 8(29), 86-90. doi:10.1017/S0003598X00116540
- Dikaios, P. (1934). Other Researches in the Neolithic Culture of Cyprus. Report of the Department of Antiquities, Cyprus, 6–7.
- Dikaios, P. (1934). Les fouilles à Chypre en 1933 et 1934. Comptes-Rendus Des Séances de l Année - Académie Des Inscriptions et Belles-Lettres, 78(3), 276. https://doi.org/10.3406/crai.1934.76530
- Dikaios, P., Dikaios, P. M., & Robinson, E. S. G. (1935). A silver stater of Idalium. The Numismatic Chronicle and Journal of the Royal Numismatic Society, 15(60), 282–284. http://www.jstor.org/stable/42664362
- Dikaios, P. (1935). A hoard of silver Cypriot staters from Larnaca. The Numismatic Chronicle and Journal of the Royal Numismatic Society, 15(59), 165–179. http://www.jstor.org/stable/42660930
- Dikaios, P. (1936). Excavations at Erimi, 1935. Report of the Department of Antiquities, Cyprus, 6–10.
- Dikaios, P. (1936). Some Neolithic Sites in Cyprus. Report of the Department of Antiquities, Cyprus, 11–13.
- Dikaios, P. (1936). La Civilisation néolithique dans l'ile de Chypre. Syria, 17(4), 356–364. http://www.jstor.org/stable/4195987
- Dikaios, P. (1936). An Iron Age Painted Amphora in the Cyprus Museum. The Annual of the British School at Athens, 37, 56–72. http://www.jstor.org/stable/30096661
- Dikaios, P. (1936). Recherches sur la civilisation néolithique en Chypre. Comptes-Rendus Des Séances de l Année - Académie Des Inscriptions et Belles-Lettres, 80(3), 218–221. https://doi.org/10.3406/crai.1936.76777
- Dikaios, P. (1939). Excavations at Khirokitia Khan. Preliminary Report. Report of the Department of Antiquities, Cyprus, 82–87.
- Dikaios, P. (1940). New Light on Prehistoric Cyprus. Iraq, 7(1), 69–83. doi:10.2307/4241665
- Dikaios, P. (1940). I.—The Excavations at Vounous-Bellapais in Cyprus, 1931–2. Archaeologia, 88, 1–174. doi:10.1017/S0261340900014557
- Dikaios, P. (1945). Archaeology in Cyprus, 1939-45. The Journal of Hellenic Studies, 65, 104–105. https://doi.org/10.2307/626343
- Dikaios, P. (1946). Two “Naucratite” Chalices from Marium. The Journal of Hellenic Studies, 66, 5–7. https://doi.org/10.2307/626531
- Dikaios, P. (1948). The Bronze Statue of Septimius Severus in the Cyprus Museum. Archaeology, 1(3), 146–147. http://www.jstor.org/stable/41662230
- Dikaios, P. (1948). Une coupe peinte Chypriote de l'Age du Fer. Revue Archéologique, 29/30, 316–325. http://www.jstor.org/stable/41028695
- Dikaios, P. (1951). Principal Acquisitions of the Cyprus Museum, 1937-1939. Report of the Department of Antiquities, Cyprus, 197–202.
- Dikaios, P. (1953). Khirokitia: Final Report on the Excavation of a Neolithic Settlement in Cyprus on behalf of the Department of Antiquities, 1936–1946. Oxford University Press.
- Dikaios, P. (1961). Archaeology in Cyprus, 1959-61. Archaeological Reports, 8, 32–46. https://doi.org/10.2307/581002
- Dikaois, P. (1961). Sotira: A Neolithic Settlement in Cyprus. Pennsylvania: University of Pennsylvania Press.
- Dikaios, P. (1962). The bronze statue of a horned god from Enkomi. In Heft 1/1962 (pp. 1–20). De Gruyter. https://doi.org/10.1515/9783112314616-003
- Dikaios, P. (1963). A Royal Tomb at Salamis, Cyprus. Archäologischer Anzeiger, 126–208.
- Dikaios, P. (1963). The Context of the Enkomi Tablets. Kadmos, 2(1), 39-52. https://doi.org/10.1515/kadm.1963.2.1.39
- Dikaios, P. (1969–1971). Enkomi: Excavations 1948–1958, Vols. I–IIIb. Mainz am Rhein: Verlag Philipp von Zabern.

== See also ==
- Peter Megaw
- Hector Catling
- Swedish Cyprus Expedition
