= Basilica of Panagia Limeniotissa =

- (Greek: Βασιλική Παναγίας Λιμενιώτισσας)
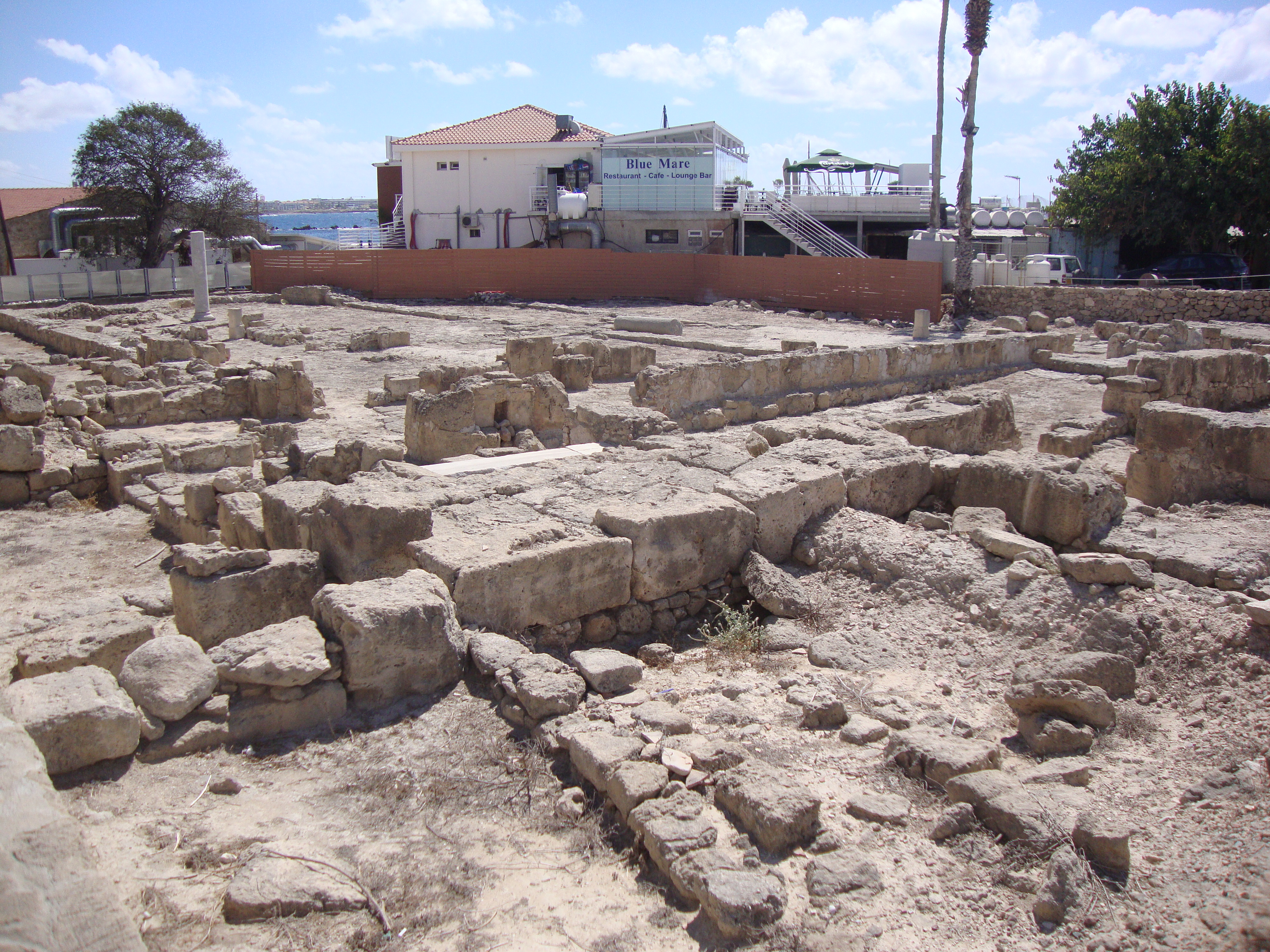

- Location within Cyprus

General information
- Location: Paphos, Cyprus
- Coordinates: 34.75581°N 32.40784°E

The Basilica of Panagia Limeniotissa (Greek: Βασιλική της Παναγίας Λιμενιώτισσας) is a ruined basilica in Paphos, Cyprus. It was built at the beginning of the 5th century CE and it is dedicated to "Our Lady of the Harbour".

It is situated in a short distance north of Paphos harbour, close to the restaurants of the harbour and it is part of the Paphos Archaeological Park. Visitors can see some colourful mosaics and a few restored columns.

== History ==
=== Late Antiquity ===
The Panagia Limeniotissa basilica was built in the early 5th century AD, during the Early Christian period when Cyprus was part of the Byzantine Empire. It originally comprised three aisles with two rows of marble columns, an apse and a narthex. The floors and walls were decorated with coloured mosaics in geometric patterns.

In 653, the basilica was nearly destroyed during the Arab raids against the island. The Arabs maintained a garrison there, using the basilica as workshops, stables, and living quarters for the army. They also built a tower in its narthex which could have served as a watchtower, lighthouse, or a minaret. In 688, after they evacuated the island, the church was rebuilt as a three-aisled barrel vaulted basilica at a smaller scale than its predecessor.

=== Medieval ===
In 1159, according to Neophytos of Cyprus, an earthquake destroyed the rebuilt basilica along with thirteen other churches in the district of Paphos. A smaller structure was built upon the ruins of the old basilica but it was destroyed by the 1222 earthquake. The church was then left in ruins.

=== 20th century ===
The exact location of the Panagia Limeniotissa basilica was unknown until the 20th century; it was identified in 1937 and officially excavated in 1959. Today, the Panagia Limeniotissa basilica is part of Paphos Archaeological Park in ancient Nea Paphos, which is a UNESCO World Heritage Site.
