= Department of Antiquities (Cyprus) =

Department of the government of Cyprus

Department of Antiquities Τμήμα Αρχαιοτήτων
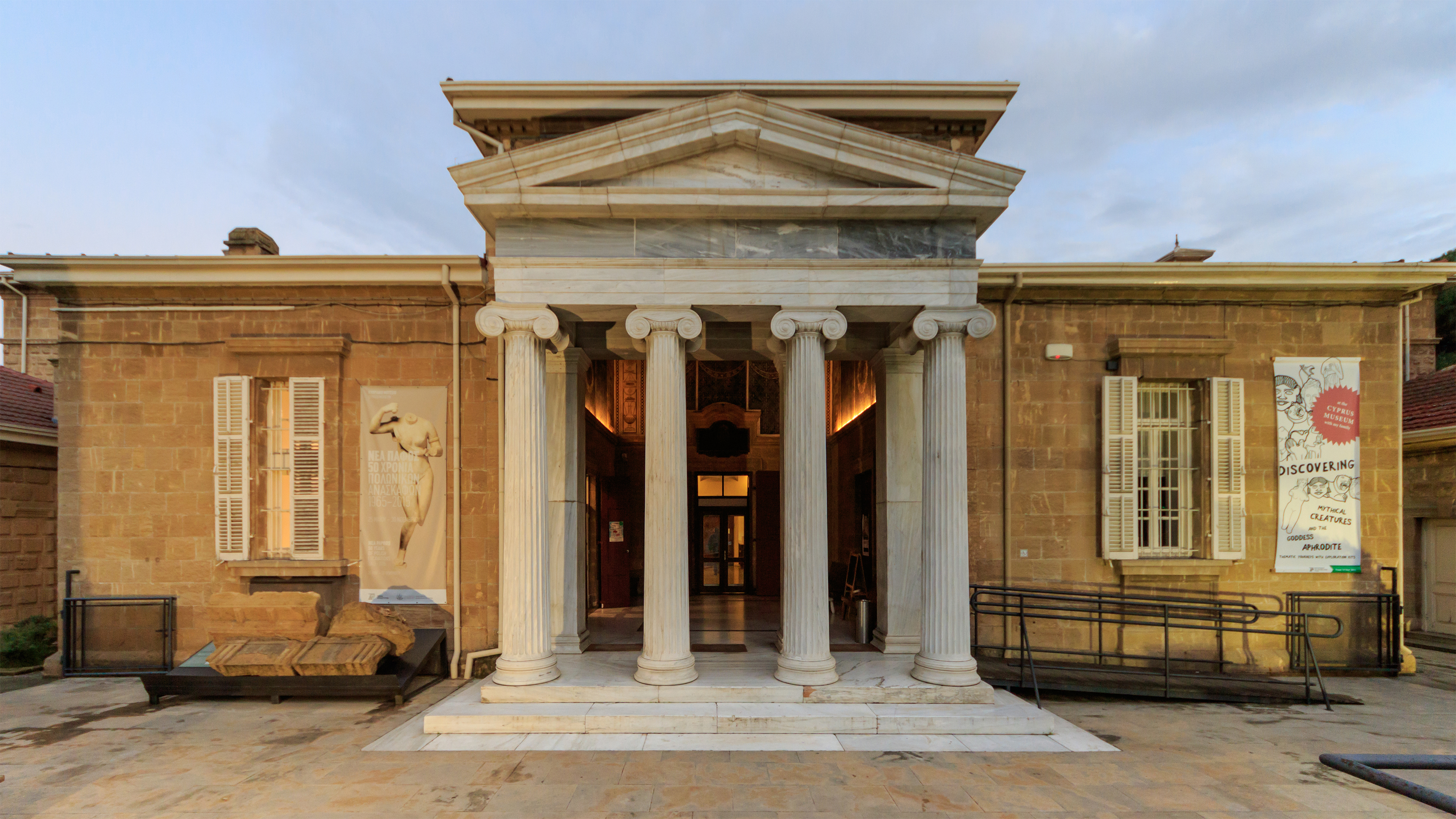
- Building of the Cyprus Museum in Nicosia
- Predecessor: Committee of the Cyprus Museum
- Formation: 1935
- Legal status: Government department (Deputy Ministry of Culture)
- Headquarters: Nicosia
- Region served: Cyprus
- Director of the Department of Antiquities: Giorgos Georgiou
- Website: www.culture.gov.cy/dmculture/da/da.nsf

The Department of Antiquities (Greek: Τμήμα Αρχαιοτήτων, romanized: Tmíma Archaiotíton) is a government department of the Republic of Cyprus with responsibility for archaeological research and cultural heritage management.

== History ==
The Department of Antiquities was established in 1935 by the British colonial government. It took over the responsibilities of the Committee of the Cyprus Museum that was established in 1882.

It has conducted excavations at Khoirokoitia, Kition, Amathus, Kourion, Paphos, Salamis, and Enkomi and carried multiple rescue excavations all around the island. The Department of Antiquities operates various archaeological sites such as Idalion, Kourion, and Paphos Archaeological Park and museums like the Cyprus Museum, archaeological district museums of Paphos, Limassol, Kition and smaller local museums like the Hadjigeorgakis Kornesios Mansion.

In 1955, Director Peter Megaw established the Archaeological Survey Branch, also known as Cyprus Survey, and appointed Hector Catling as the head, Kyriacos Nicolaou as an Assistant and a number of technicians. The Branch was downgraded after the 1974 war and dissolved in 1979. In 1979 a position for traditional architecture and folk art was created.

Until 1960 the conservation works focused only on monuments dating to antiquity, the Byzantine and Medieval period. Since then there have been restoration of Ottoman, British Colonial and Traditional monuments.

From 1935 until the 1st of July 2023 the Department operated under the Ministry of Transport, Communications and Works, until its transfer in the newly created Deputy Ministry of Culture.

=== Repatriation of Artifacts ===
The Department of Antiquities has been successful in repatriating stolen Cypriot artifacts from abroad. In 2023, 80 artifacts were returned from the United States, including items covering a wide range of Cypriot history. Additionally, 36 artifacts were repatriated from Australia, involving collaborations with the Australian government and academic institutions.

=== Digitisation Initiatives ===
The Department has launched a comprehensive digitisation programme named "Digitising the Museums of Cyprus," funded by the European Economic Area Financial Mechanism and Norway Grants. The initiative aims to digitise 96,000 artifacts from various museums across Cyprus to enhance the management and accessibility of Cyprus's cultural heritage.

== Legislation ==
The first Antiquities Law of 1905, which was amended by in 1927 and then replaced in 1935, with the formal establishment of the Department. The 1927 law allowed partage, giving one third of the excavated material to the archaeologist, a third to the owner of the excavated land (which was usually bought by the archaeologist), and a third to the Cyprus Museum. The law allowed for the export of antiquities, two thirds of the excavated material of the Swedish Cyprus Expedition were used as one of the foundational collections of the Medelhavsmuseet.

=== Antiquities Laws ===
- Antiquities Law of 1905
- Antiquities (Amendment) Law, 1927
- Antiquities (Amendment) Law, 1928
- Antiquities Law of 1935
- Antiquities (Amendment) Law, 1945
- Antiquities Regulations, 1953

== Publications ==
The Department publishes since 1915 the Report of the Department of Antiquities, Cyprus (RDAC) as well as the Annual Report of the Director of the Department of Antiquities Cyprus (ARDAC). The ARDAC for the years 2006-2009 can be accessed online. Additionally, it publishes its own excavations.

== Organisation ==
The department is headed by the Director of the Department of Antiquities, next in line is the position of the Director of the Cyprus Museum and following that, the Curator of Monuments.

=== Directors of the Department of Antiquities ===
- John Robert Hilton (1934-1935)
- Peter Megaw (1935-1960)
- Porphyrios Dikaios (1960-1963)
- Vassos Karageorghis (1963-1989)
- Athanasios Papageorgiou (1989-1991)
- Demos Christou (1991-1997)
- Sophocles Hadjisavvas (1997-2004)
- Pavlos Flourentzos (2004-2009)
- Maria Hadjicosti (2009-2013)
- Marina Solomidou-Ieronymidou (2013-1/11/2023)
- Giorgos Georgiou (15/02/2023-current)

=== Curators of the Cyprus Museum, now Curators of Museums ===
- Ieronymos Peristianes (ca. 1910)
- Menelaos Markides (1912-1931)
- Porphyrios Dikaios (1931-1960)
- Vassos Karageorghis (1960-1963)
- Kyriakos Nicolaou (1964-1979)
- Pavlos Flourentzos (1993-2004)
- Despo Pilides (until 2021)
- Eftychia Zachariou

==== Assistant Curators of the Cyprus Museum ====
- Porphyrios Dikaios (1929-1931)
- Vassos Karageorghis (1952-1960)
- Andreas Dikigoropoulos (-1960)
- Kyriakos Nicolaou (1961-1964)
- Elli Klokkari Pitsilidou

=== Curators of Monuments ===
- George H. Everett Jeffery (1903-1935)
- Athanasios Papageorgiou (1962-1989)
- Sophocles Hadjisavvas (1990-1997)
- Maria Hadjicosti
- Giorgos Filotheou
- Giorgos Georgiou (-15/02/2023)
- Chrysanthi Kounnou (15/03/2026-)

=== Inspectors of Antiquities ===
- Joan du Plat Taylor (1932-)
- Rupert Gunnis (1932-1935)

=== Archaeological Survey Officers ===
- Hector Catling (1955-1959)
- Kyriakos Nicolaou (1959-1979)
- Michalis Loulloupis (-1974)

== See also ==
- Department of Antiquities
- Greek Archaeological Service
- List of museums in Cyprus
