= Hector Catling =

British archaeologist (1924–2013)

Hector William Catling
- Born: 26 June 1924
- Died: 15 February 2013 (aged 88)
- Resting place: Church of St Mary & All Saints, Broomfield, Somerset
- Education: Bristol Grammar School; St John's College, Oxford
- Occupations: Academic, Archaeologist
- Years active: 1951–1989
- Title: Director of the British School at Athens
- Term: 1971–1989
- Predecessor: P M Fraser
- Successor: E B French
- Spouse: Elizabeth Salter (1948 – 2000; her death)
- Children: Three
- Awards: Commander of the Order of the British Empire (CBE); Fellow of the Society of Antiquaries (FSA)

Hector William Catling, CBE, FSA (26 June 1924 – 15 February 2013) was a British archaeologist who served as director of the British School at Athens between 1971 and 1989.

== Early life ==
Catling was born on 26 June 1924. He was educated at Bristol Grammar School, then a grammar school in the Clifton area of Bristol. He went on to study Literae Humaniores at St John's College, University of Oxford. He remained there to take a doctorate on the Cypriot Bronze Age. This was later published under the title Cypriot Bronze work in the Mycenaean World.

== Academic career ==
In 1951 he came to Cyprus with a British archaeological mission led by Joan du Plat Taylor to excavate at the Late Bronze Age sanctuary at Myrtou-Pigadhes. Additionally, in 1951 he surveyed Hala Sultan Tekke. Between 1955 and 1959, he was Archaeological Survey Officer of the Department of Antiquities of Cyprus. Catling left in 1960 with the independence of Cyprus from British colonial rule. His work in the Archaeological Survey has laid the groundwork for all later survey, topographical and landscape work done in Cypriot archaeology.

From 1960 to 1971, he was successively assistant keeper and senior assistant keeper at the Department of Antiquities of the Ashmolean Museum, Oxford. In 1971, he was appointed director of the British School at Athens. He served in that post until 1989. He carried systematic excavations at the North Cemetery of Knossos with Nicolas Coldstream and with the British School at Athens at Menelaion. In the last years of his life he gathered material to publish an excavation conducted by Terence Mitford and John Ilife at Palaepaphos during the 50's, unfortunately he died before completing it. The monograph was finished and published posthumously.

He was a Supernumerary Fellow of Linacre College, University of Oxford.

== Later life ==
Following his retirement in 1989, Catling founded the Friends of the British School at Athens. He served as its honorary secretary until 2011.

Catling died on 15 February 2013 at his home. His funeral was held at St Matthew's Church, Langford, Oxfordshire on 1 March 2013. He was buried in Church of St Mary & All Saints, Broomfield.

== Personal life ==
In 1948, Catling married Elizabeth Salter. She predeceased him in 2000. Together they had three children: Susan, Richard (also an archaeologist), and Charles.

== Honours ==
In the 1980 Queen's Birthday Honours, he was appointed Officer of the Order of the British Empire (OBE) 'for services to British cultural interests in Greece'. In the 1989 Queen's Birthday Honours, he was promoted to Commander of the Order of the British Empire (CBE) again 'for services to British cultural interests in Greece'.

He was awarded an Honorary Doctorate by the National and Kapodistrian University of Athens. He was an Honorary Member of the Archaeological Society of Athens and a Corresponding Member of the German Archaeological Institute.

== Publications ==
- Catling, H. W. (1957). Bronze Cut-and-Thrust swords in the Eastern Mediterranean. Proceedings of the Prehistoric Society, 22, 102–125.
- Catling, H. W. (1961). A New Bronze Sword from Cyprus. Antiquity, 35(138), 115–122.
- Catling, H. W. (1962). Patterns of settlement in Bronze Age Cyprus. Opuscula Atheniensia, IV, 129–169.
- Catling, H. W. (1964). Cypriot Bronzework in the Mycenaean World.
- Catling, H. W. (1972). An Early Byzantine Pottery Factory at Dhiorios in Cyprus. Levant, 4(1), 1–82.
- Catling, H. W., & MacGillivray, J. A. (1983). An Early Cypriot III Vase from the Palace at Knossos. The Annual of the British School at Athens, 78, 1–8.
- Catling, H. W. (2001). A Medieval Tombstone in the Paphos Museum. British School at Athens Studies, 8, 139–144.
- Catling, H. W. (2020). Kouklia. Late Bronze Age and Early Iron Age Tombs at Palaepaphos 1951-1954, Volumes I and II. Excavations of the Liverpool City Museum and St Andrews University Expedition to Palaepaphos.
