= Vassos Karageorghis =

Cypriot archaeologist (1929–2021)

Vassos Karageorghis (Greek: Βάσος Καραγιώργης) FBA (29 April 1929 – 21 December 2021) was a Cypriot archaeologist and director of the Department of Antiquities, Cyprus.

== Early life and education ==
He attended the Pancyprian Gymnasium, he studied Classics in the University of Athens and at University College London, having the chance to excavate at Verulamium under Sir Mortimer Wheeler.

== Career ==
He was Assistant Curator of the Cyprus Museum between 1952 and 1960 and Curator from 1960 until 1963. Afterwards with the retirement of Porphyrios Dikaios he became Director of the Department of Antiquities from 1963 to 1989. He is notable for the excavation of the Iron Age necropolis of Salamis, his excavations at Kition and the Geometric necropolis at Palaepaphos. He published extensive catalogues of Cypriot collections in museums in Cyprus and abroad. In 1981, Karageorghis became a founding member of the World Cultural Council. He was Professor of archaeology and Director of the Archaeological Research Unit of the University of Cyprus. He was a Corresponding Fellow of the Archaeological Institute of America and the Academy of Athens.

He died on 21 December 2021 at the age of 92.

== Publications ==
- Karageorghis, V. (1967-78). Excavations in the Necropolis at Salamis.
- Karageorghis, V. (1977). 'Pottery from Kition', in E.Gjerstad (ed.), Greek Geometric and Archaic Poetry found in Cyprus, 61-4.
- Καραγεώργης, Β. (1980). Οι Αρκάδες στην Παλαίπαφο. Πρακτικά της Ακαδημίας Αθηνών, 72-85.
- Καραγεώργης, Β. (1984). Νέο φώς στην Ιστορία της Ύστερης Εποχής του Χαλκού στην Κύπρο. Πρακτικά της Ακαδημίας Αθηνών, 219-229.
- Καραγεώργης, Β. (1985). Οι Έλληνες στην Κύπρο, Πρακτικά της Ακαδημίας Αθηνών, 432-442.
- Καραγεώργης, Β. (1992). Μακεδονικά στοιχεία στον Ελληνιστικό πολιτισμό της Κύπρου, Πρακτικά της Ακαδημίας Αθηνών, 704-712.
- Karageorghis, V. (1999). A Cypriot Silver Bowl Reconsidered, 1. The Iconography of the Decoration Metropolitan Museum Journal, v. 34.
- Karageorghis, V. (2000). Ancient Art from Cyprus: The Cesnola Collection in The Metropolitan Museum of Art.
- Karageorghis, V. (2000). Ancient Art from Cyprus: The Cesnola Collection.
- Karageorghis, V. (2002). 'La Nécropole "royale" de Salamine: quarante an après', CCEC 32: 19-29.
- Karageorghis, V. (2002). Early Cyprus.
- Karageorghis, V. (2006). 'Homeric Cyprus', in S.Deger-Jalkotzy and I.S.Lemos (eds.), Ancient Greece: From Mycenaean Palaces to the Age of Homer, 665-75.
- Karageorghis, V. (2016) The Cesnola Collection of Cypriot Art: Terracottas. New York: The Metropolitan Museum of Art.
