= Cyprus Museum =

Archaeological museum in Nicosia, Cyprus

Coordinates: 35°10′18″N 33°21′19″E

The Cyprus Museum
- Κυπριακό Μουσείο; Kıbrıs Müzesi
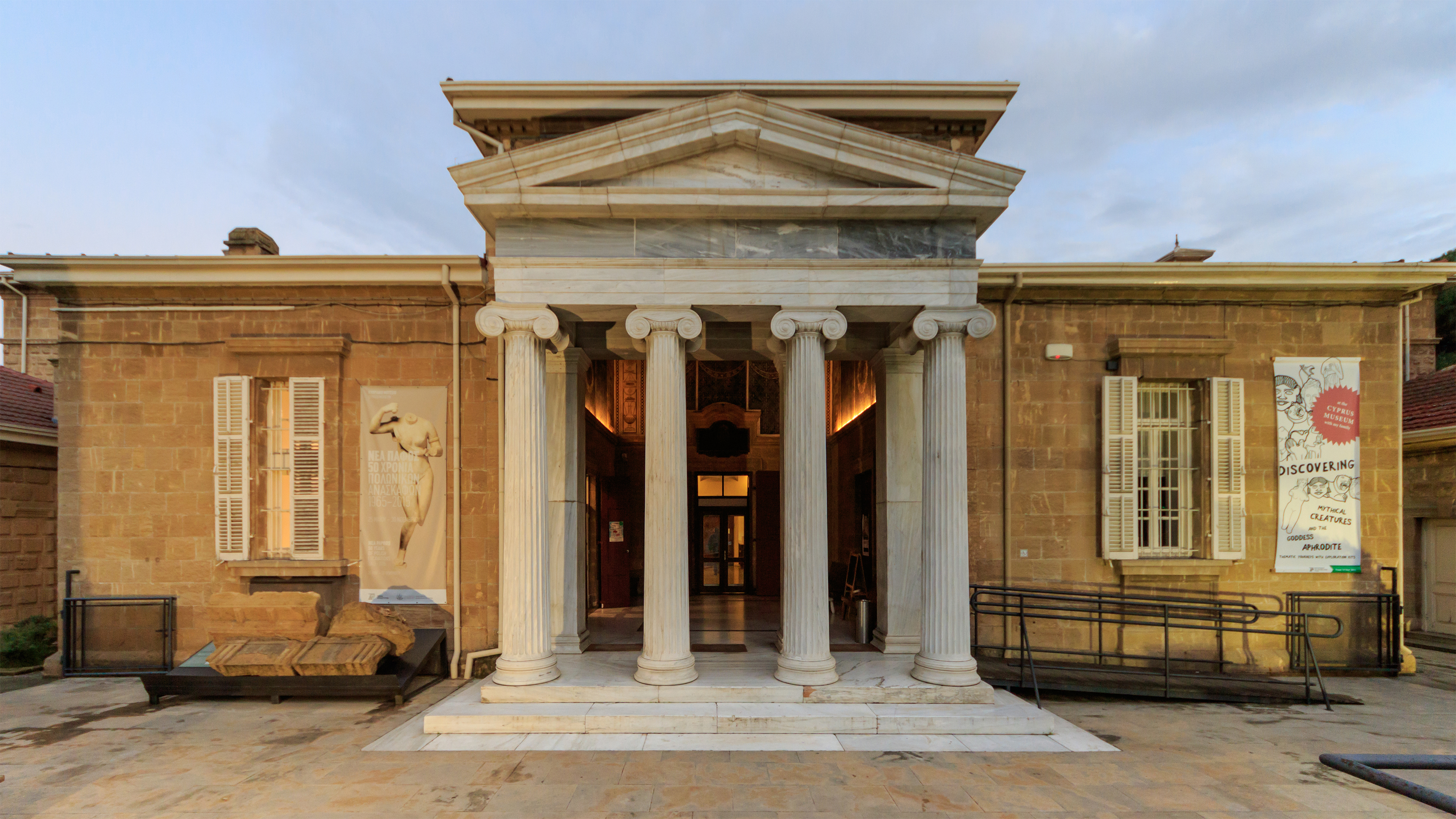
- Building of the Cyprus Museum in Nicosia
- Established: 1882
- Location: 1 Museum Street, Nicosia, Cyprus
- Type: Archaeological
- Curator: Ms. Eftychia Zachariou
- Website: www.mcw.gov.cy/da

The Cyprus Museum (Greek: Κυπριακό Μουσείο, romanized: Kypriakó Mouseío; Turkish: Kıbrıs Müzesi), also known as the Cyprus Archaeological Museum (Αρχαιολογικό Μουσείο της Κύπρου, Archaiologikó Mouseío tis Kýprou; Kıbrıs Arkeoloji Müzesi), is the oldest and largest archaeological museum in Cyprus, located on Museum Street in central Nicosia.

The museum is home to the most extensive collection of Cypriot antiquities in the world, and houses artifacts discovered during numerous excavations on the island. Its history goes hand in hand with the course of modern archaeology (and the Department of Antiquities) in Cyprus. Of note is that only artefacts discovered on the island are displayed.

== History ==
As an institution, the Cyprus Museum was founded in 1882 during the British occupation of the island following a petition by the Cypriot people. The petition was delivered to the British administration by a delegation headed by the religious leaders of both the Christian and Muslim populations. A major catalyst for this action were several illicit excavations and the smuggling of antiquities off the island. The most extensive of these had been carried out a few years earlier by the United States consul, Luigi Palma di Cesnola, who had smuggled over 35,000 artefacts off the island, most of which were destroyed in transit. Many of the surviving items ended up in the newly formed Metropolitan Museum of Art in New York and are currently on display in their own galleries on the second floor.

The initial museum was funded by private donations and was temporarily housed in existing governmental offices. It moved to its own premises in 1889 on Victoria Street within the medieval walls of the city. Construction of the current building began in 1908 and was completed in 1924. It was funded by public money and private subscriptions. It was originally dedicated to the memory of the British monarch, Queen Victoria. It was designed by the architect N. Balanos of the Archaeological Society of Athens and construction was supervised by George H. Everett Jeffery then curator of the museum. In 1961 a second set of galleries, storerooms and offices was completed. It published the Cyprus Museum Annual Report.

== Collections ==
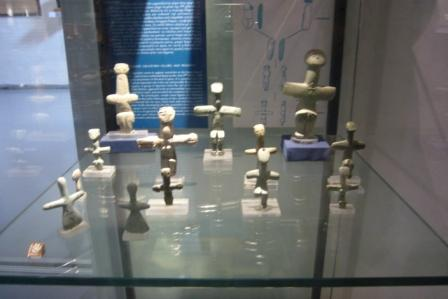
Chalcolithic cruciform figurines found in Lemba. These are made from picrolite and on display in Gallery 1.

Soon after its inception, the museum started receiving items from the numerous excavations on the island, mainly run by British and European expeditions. Indicative are the annual excavation reports published in The Journal of Hellenic Studies from 1890 onwards. The first organised catalogue was soon compiled and published in 1899 by Sir John Myres and Max Ohnefalsch-Richter. The collections of the museum were greatly augmented by the first large scale systematic excavations carried out by the Swedish Cyprus Expedition between 1927 and 1931 under the direction of professor Einar Gjerstad.

Today, the Cyprus Museum remains the principal show-piece for finds preceding independence (1960). It also houses the most important recent acquisitions. Recent years have seen a progressive decentralization of Cyprus's museum collections and most finds from current excavations are deposited in the local district museums. The museum consists of fourteen display halls surrounding a square central area which comprises auxiliary offices, a library, storerooms and laboratories for preserving and studying items in the collection. The displays in each hall follow a chronological and a thematical succession starting from the Neolithic period and ending with the Roman period.

== Future ==
The museum collection has far outgrown the capacity of the existing buildings so much so that only a small fraction is on display at any point in time. With several ongoing excavations and constant new finds, the issue of relocation to more spacious premises has been raised but a suitable site has yet to be decided on. There have been suggestions that the nearby and now demolished building of the Nicosia Old General Hospital be redeveloped, whilst there have also been plans to create a new museum as part of a new larger cultural centre at the site of the old GSP stadium.
