= Philia culture =

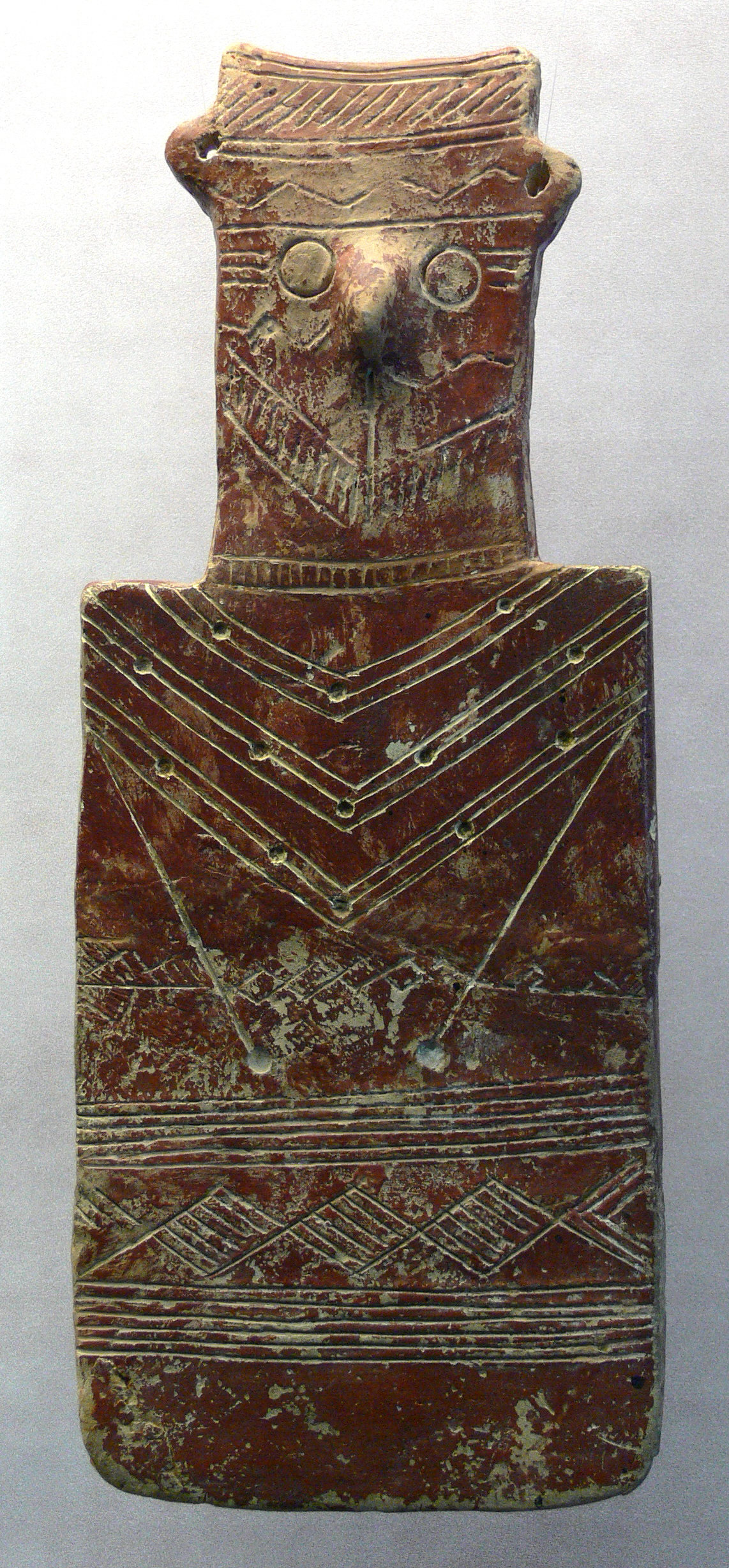
Cypriot idol, "Red Polished Ware" (2100–2000 BC). Museum zu Allerheiligen.

The Philia culture (or Philia group) existed on the island of Cyprus at the start of the Early Bronze Age between 2450 and 2200 BC. It derives its name from a location in Morphou, Cyprus.

== Characteristics ==
Philia culture marks the transition from the Chalcolithic to the Bronze Age in mid-third millennium Cyprus. It is associated with an initial intrusion of autonomous groups from Anatolia into Cyprus, which later developed a distinct, identifiable Philia cultural system.

In the 1990s, pottery and other finds from the excavations at Marki Alonia provided new evidence for the subsequent evolution of the widespread culture of the Early Cypriot Bronze Age. It has been clarified that, at Marki Alonia, the Philia phase preceded the Early Cypriote I and II materials.

Philia phase sites are primarily found in the western, southwestern and central part of Cyprus.

== Discovery ==
The culture was first identified by Porphyrios Dikaios in 1942 at Philia (Laksia tou Kasinou) in the Ovgos valley of Cyprus. Dikaios discovered pottery, known as "Red Polished Ware", from the start of the Bronze Age in Cyprus which was also found in Anatolia from the Early Bronze Age II period.

== Pottery ==
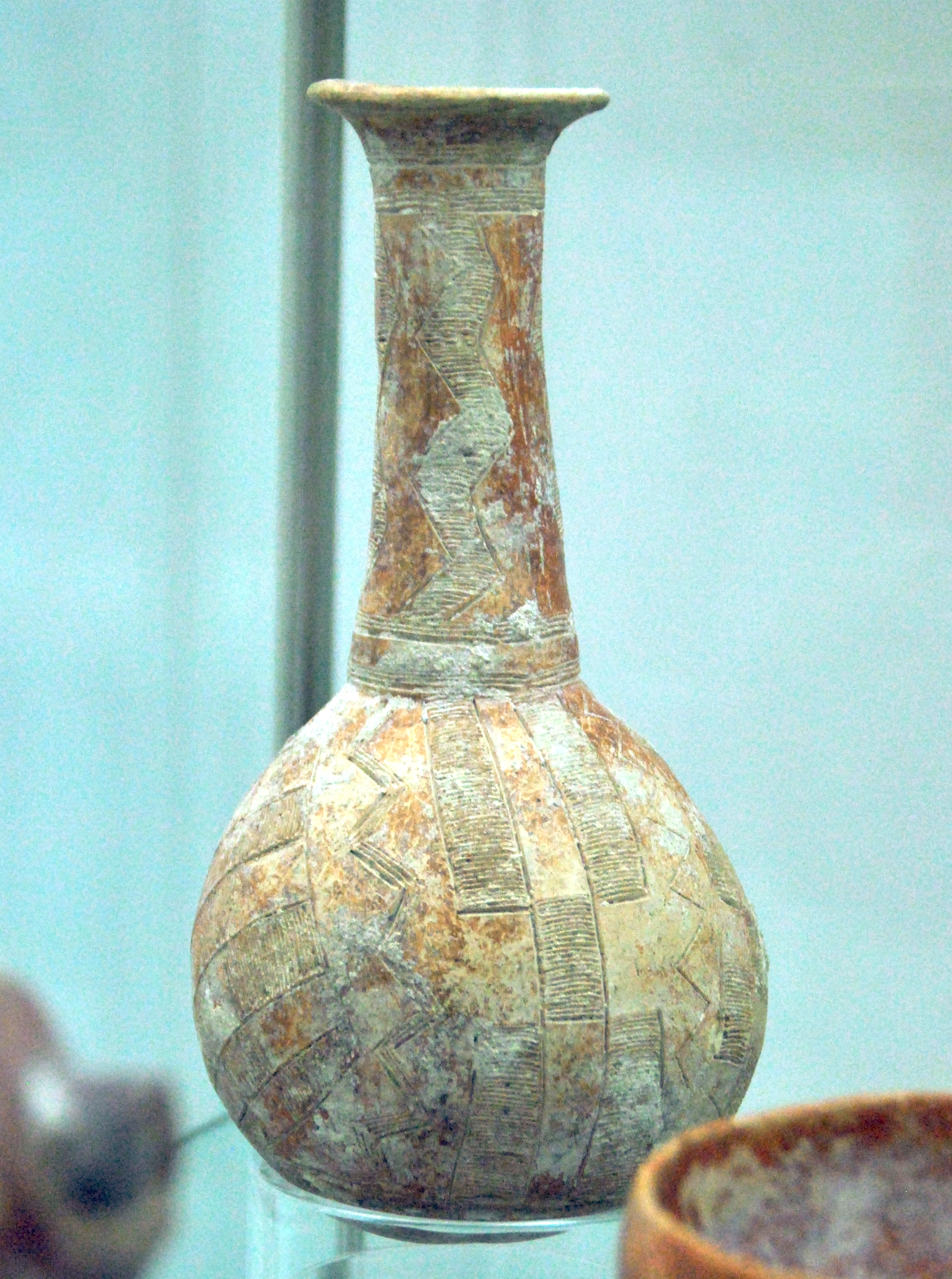
Cypriot Red Polished Ware II-III, 2200-1700 BC. Kiel, Germany

The Red Polished Ware pottery was a significant change in the lineage of ceramic ware on the island; mainly in decoration rather than morphology. The pottery was always handmade. The completed pot was coated with a mixture of liquid clay and this was then polished to give the work its smooth finish. The quantity of iron oxide in the clay combined with later incised decorations allowed for a variety of decorations to be applied.

=== Geographic distribution of finds ===
Further discoveries showed that this type of ceramic ware was not limited to the Ugarit area as further examples were later found over most of the island. The finds were concentrated in the middle section of the island running from north to south. Excavations on Kissonerga in south west Cyprus have uncovered over 300 shards of Red Polished Ware including a small jar with lime-filled incisions.

The type which has attracted the most interest in archaeology is a globular jug which has a vertical cut-away spout and is usually traced to Cilicia.

Finds of this type of pottery have also been found in other areas of the middle east including at Tarsus, Troy and other sites in western Anatolia.

=== Displays ===
There are examples of this pottery in Vienna and in the Getty collection. The British Museum has a bowl found in a tomb on the slopes of Vounous in Cyprus. This particular bowl however is thought to have originally been used for storing dried seeds.

In Cyprus displays are at the Larnaca District Archaeological Museum, Cyprus Museum and Pierides Museum.

Red Polished Ware

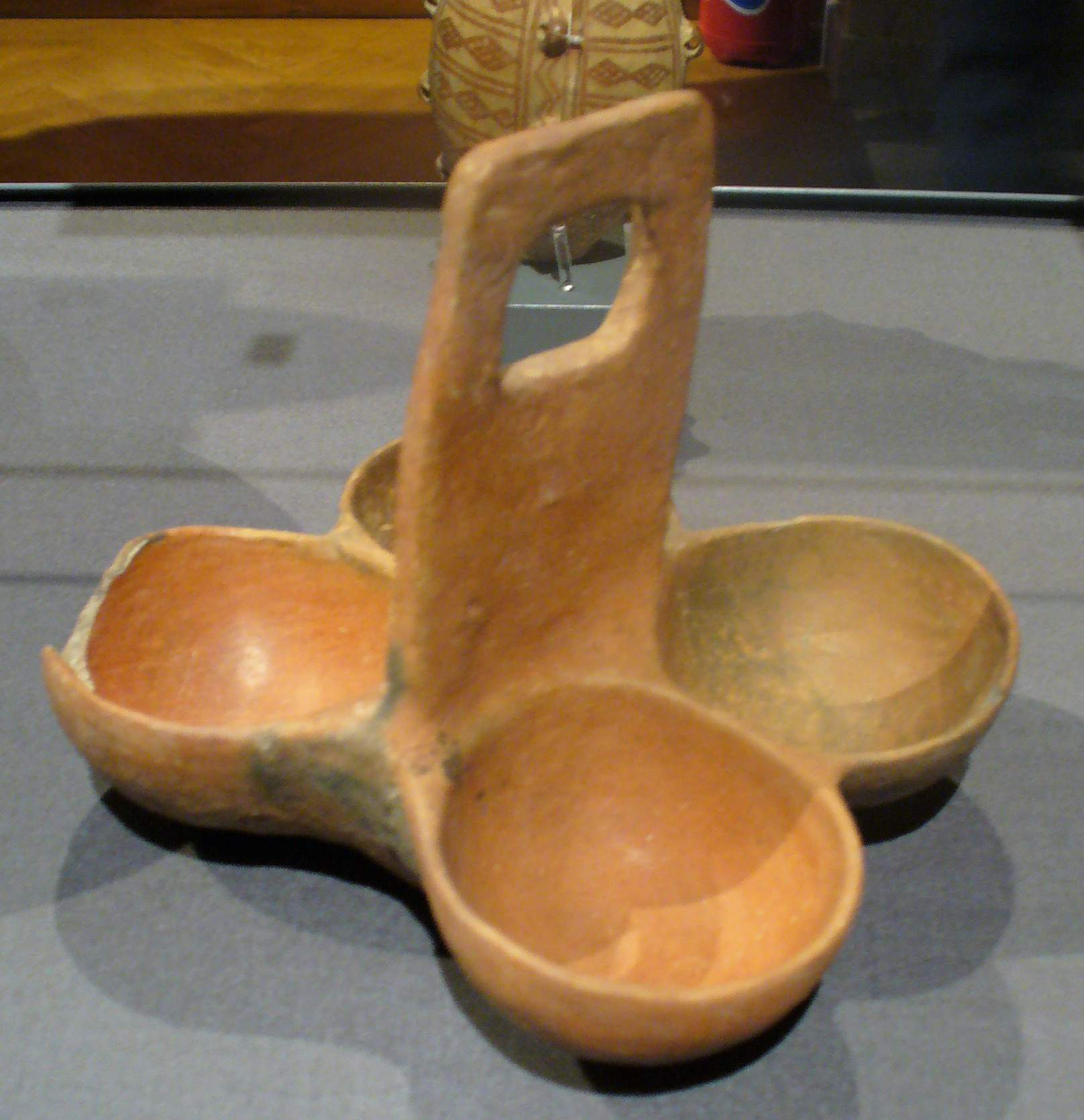
Base-ring-ware
^{Kunsthistorisches Museum, Vienna}

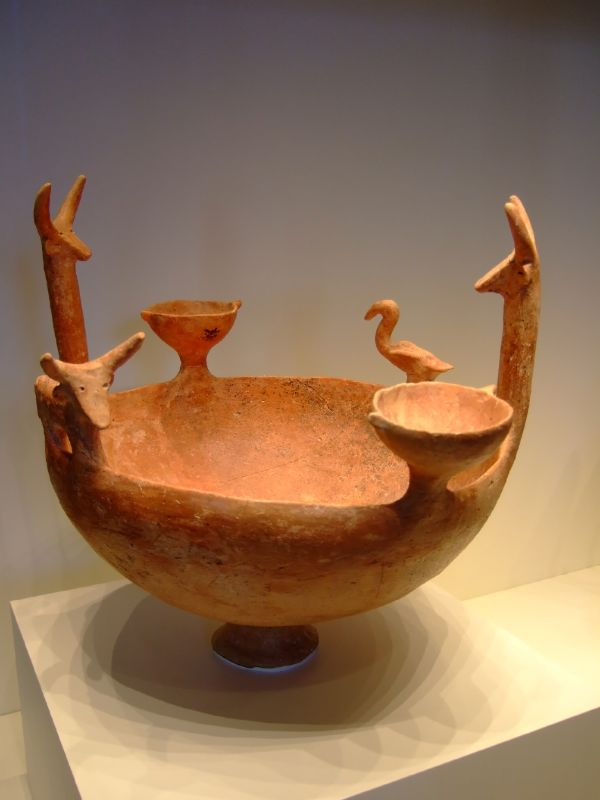
Bowl with Cattle and Vulture
^{Getty Villa, California}

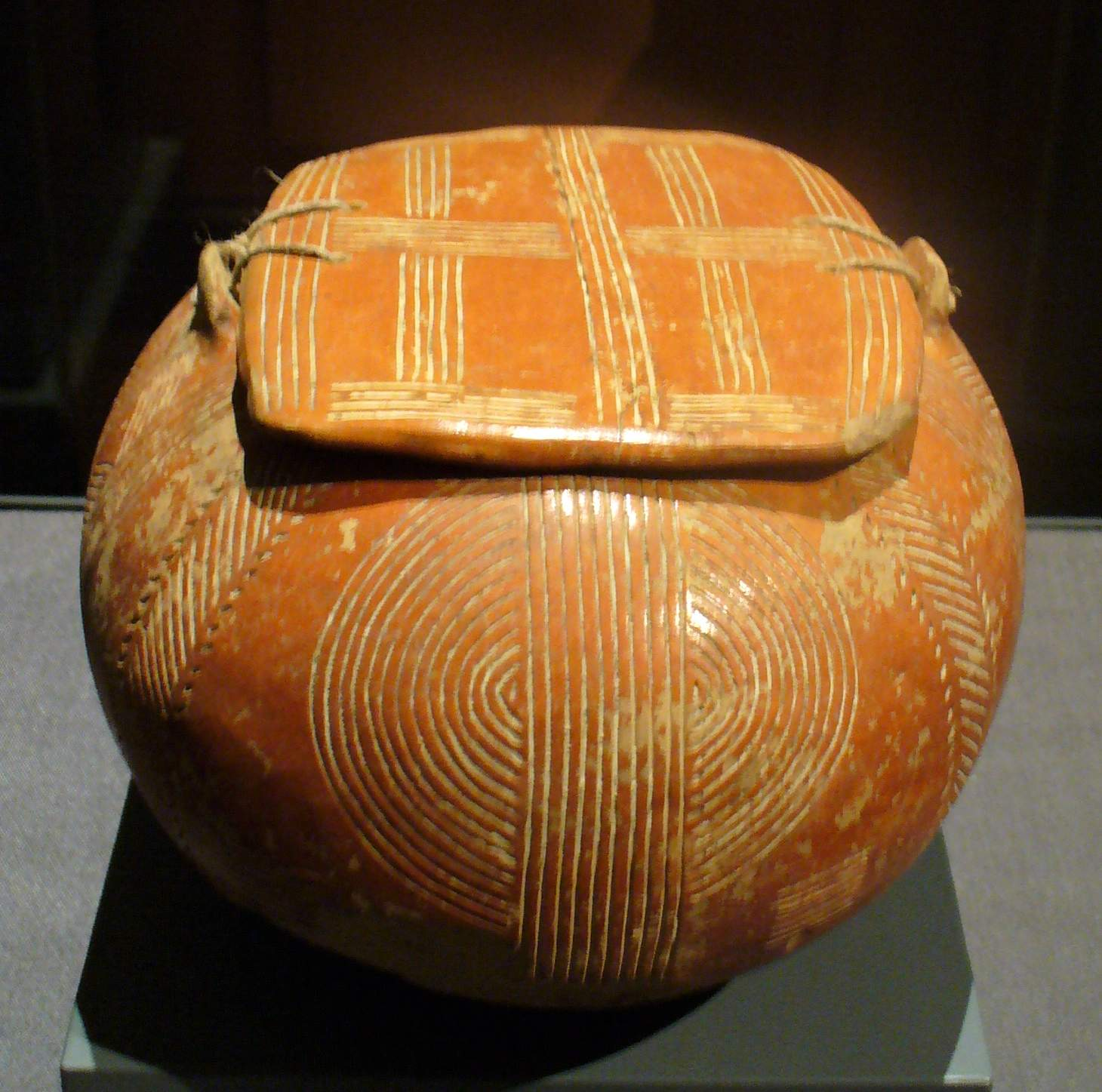
Red polished ware
^{Kunsthistorisches Museum, Vienna}

== See also ==
- Pottery of ancient Cyprus
- Ancient Cypriot art
