= Larnaca District Archaeological Museum =

Museum

Coordinates: 34.9191°N 33.6334°E

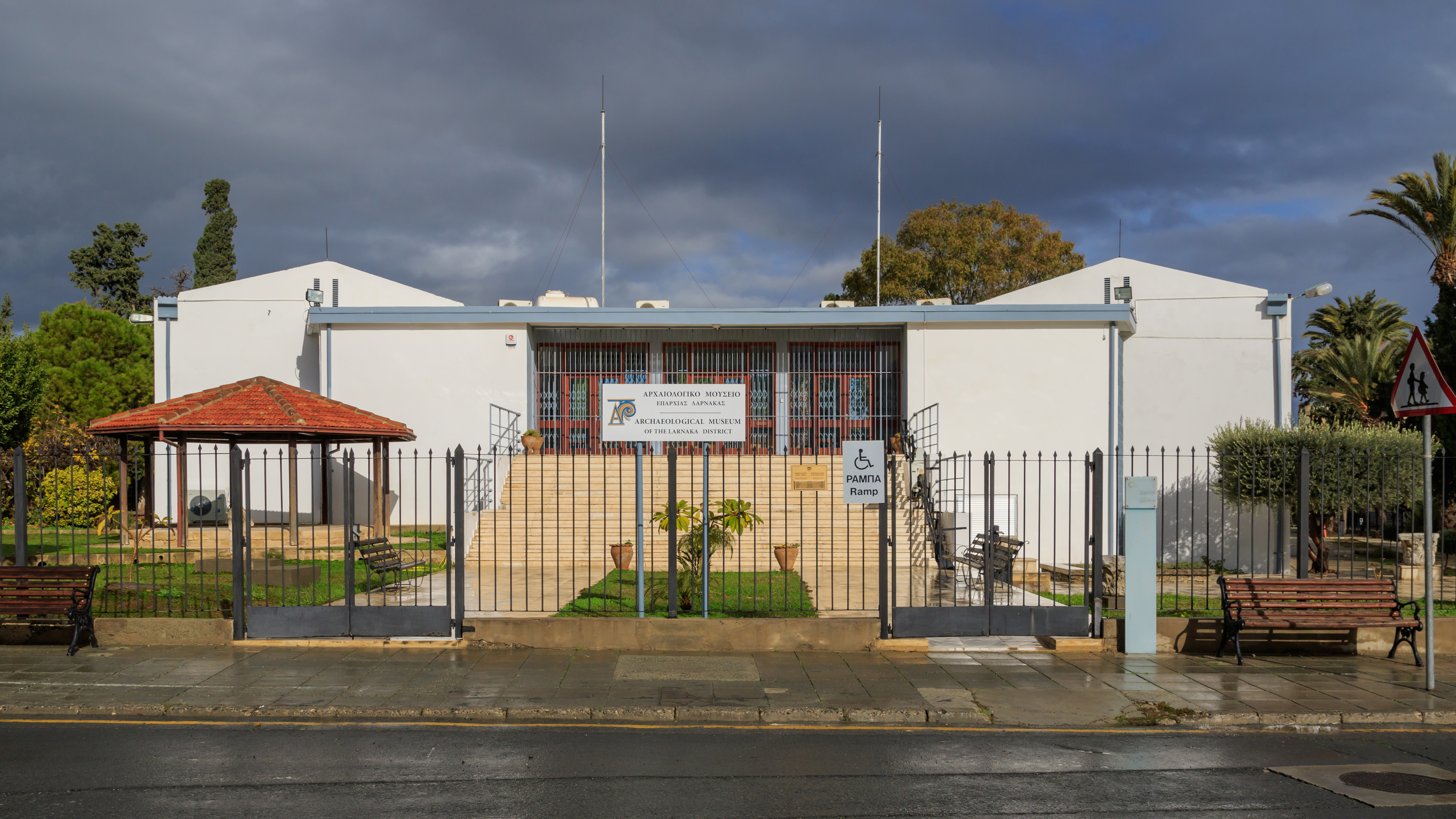

Larnaca District Museum is a museum in Larnaca, Cyprus that has displays that show the "historical development of the city of Kition and the District of Larnaka in general." It was inaugurated in 1969. and was formerly named Larnaca District Archaeological Museum. It is controlled by the Department of Antiquities.

The Kition-Bamboula archaeological site at is located around 100 meters north of the museum. Information about the site is posted on the grounds of the museum. The entrance fee at the museum is €1.70 (as of 2013)—there is no separate charge for viewing the Bamboula site.

The Kition-Kathari site is located around 500 meters further north.

== Exhibits ==
A replica of the stele of king Sargon II stands in the entrance hall.

The exhibits of pottery excavated in Cyprus include: red polished III- and -IV ware; black polished- and black slip ware—exhibit 8; drab polished ware—exhibit 9; white painted ware, black slip III-, punctured-, red-on-black ware—exhibit 10; base-ring ware—exhibit 11; white slip ware—exhibit 12: base-ring I ware—exhibit 14; Mycenean pottery types IIIA and -IIIB (found in Larnaca, dated 1230-1050 BC), Minyan ware crater—exhibit B; proto-white painted ware; Mycenean pottery III C and -rude style.

Other exhibited items consist of crater with guilloché work.

=== Room I ===
In this hall, the items are from the Neolithic-, the Chalcolithic Period, the Early Bronze Age until the end of the Middle Bronze Age.

Displayed are "bone tools (needles etc.), flint knives and jewellery of picrolite and dentalia"—all from Choirokoitia, except for knives from Kalavasos-Tenta.

The remains of an inhabitant from the Neolithic settlement at Choirokoitia is displayed like it was found, with the body "buried in a contracted [ foetal] position and [with] a heavy millstone [that] was placed on the chest and head"—which was a common burial practice at the time. The stone over parts of the body might indicate beliefs at the time, which might have included fear of the dead (and theorized capabilities of the dead, in an afterlife).

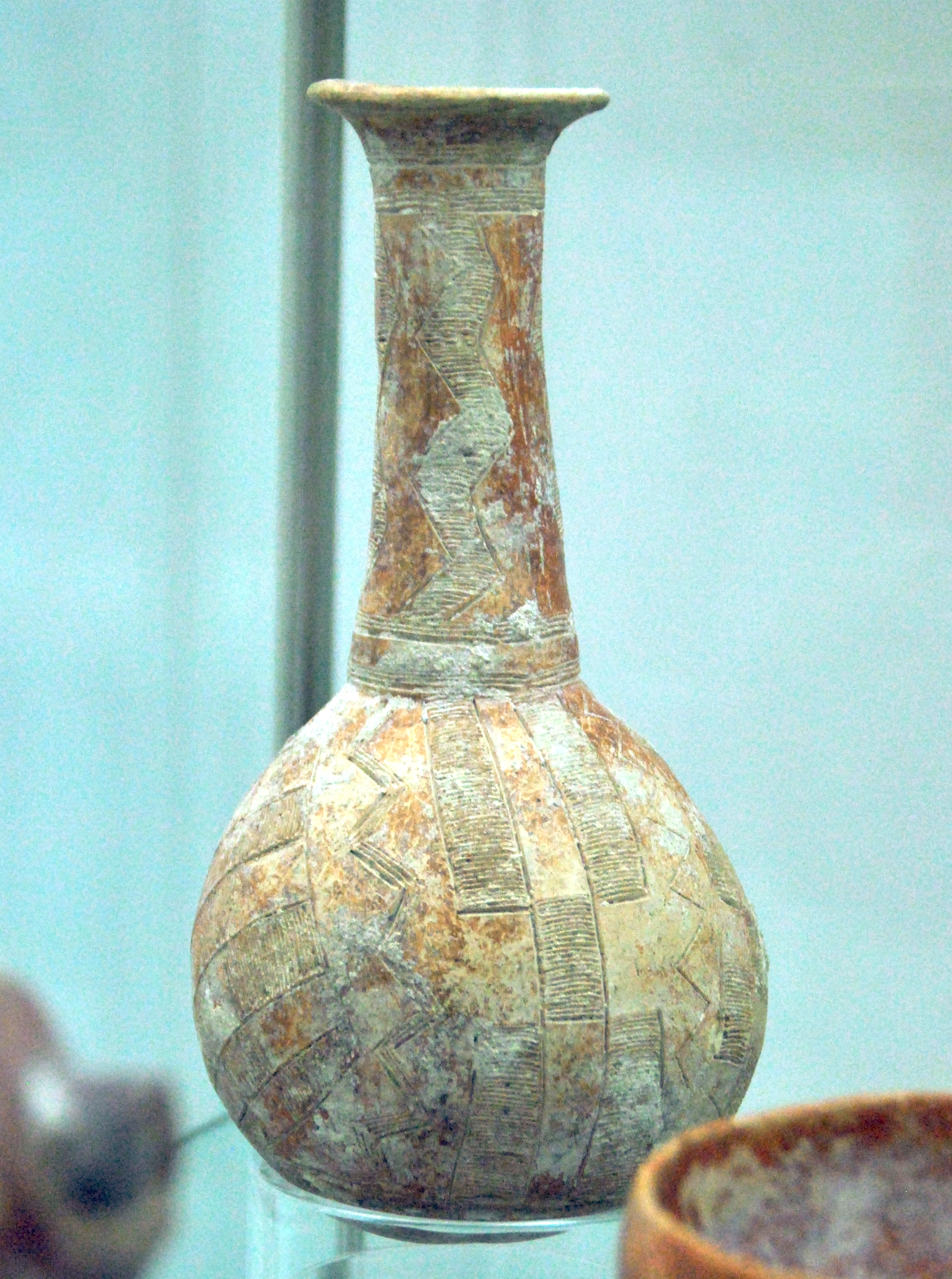
Cypriot Red Polished Ware II-III, 2200-1700 BC. Kiel, Germany

Items include stone vessels, stone idols and Comb Ceramic; a collection of pottery shards; two deer antlers—providing "evidence for the presence of this animal in Cyprus at the dawn of Cypriot pre-history"; fragments of idols from Kalavasos-Ayious and -Tenta; from the Chalcolithic Period: "a spouted bowl, vessels with cylindrical neck and a cooking vessel"; "a limestone figurine, roughly shaped in the form of a human"; vessels and tools "made of either andesite or limestone"; "pottery known as Red Polished I, II, III as well as Black Polished vessel Area II" of Kition; vessels from Pyla, Psematismenos and Kalavasos; a ritual vase—"spouted and decorated with moulded small vessels" placed near the rim; "an oinochoe and a flask of Red Polished ware from a tomb at Kalavasos";

Pottery of ancient Cyprus displayed, include stone vessels from Kalavasos' and Choirokoitia's Neolithic Period.

Wall mounted text tells about excavations including those at Maroni-Vournes (involving British Museum and University of Cincinnati), Kalavasos-Tenta and Kition.

=== Room II ===
Items from Mycenaen Period are emphasized in this hall.

Pottery of ancient Cyprus displayed include "jugs and stemmed kylikes of LH IIIA:2 type", including amphorae (with three handles), bowls and pyxides.

The finds are from Pyla, Tersefanou (Arpera), Kalavasos and Alykes (Hala Sultan Tekke).

Other exhibited items consist of Horns of Consecration.

Items imported to Cyprus during the Late Bronze Age include "a faience sceptre with the cartouche of Pharaoh Horemheb"; and an opium pipe.

Wall mounted text tells about excavations including those at Tourapi (Τουραπή), in present-day Larnaca.

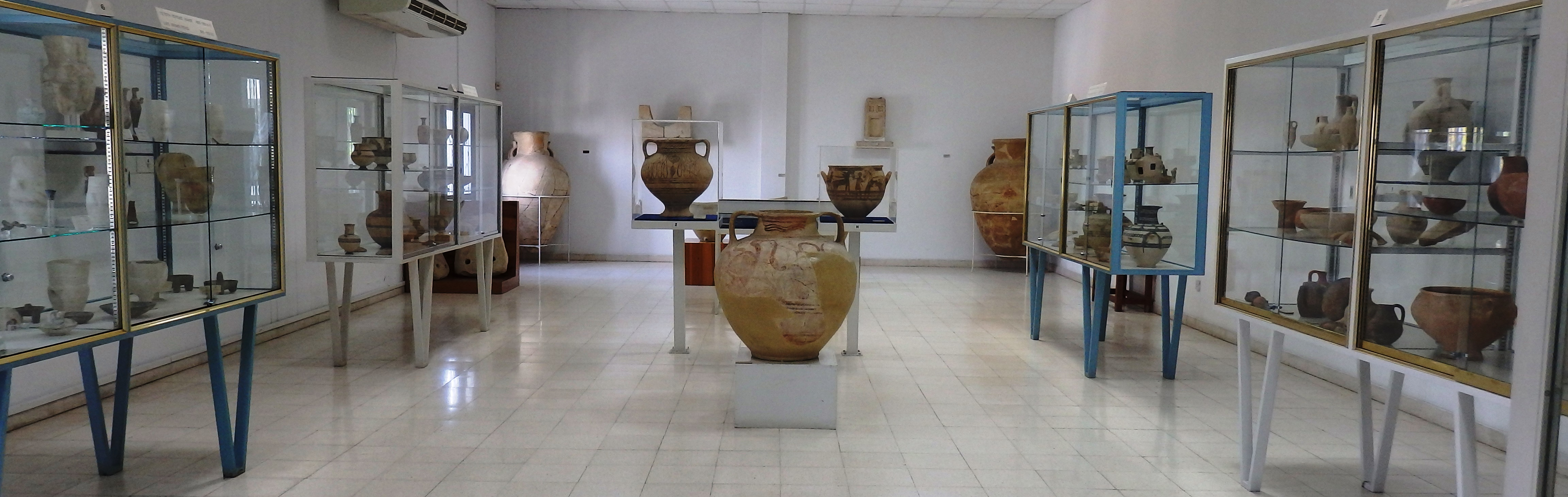
Room II

=== Room III ===
Items on display include several types of figurines: various of horse and rider (made of terracotta)—mainly found in tombs at Larnaca-Mnemata, a quatrine with a charioteer and a chariot racer (one of the horses is missing).; "Limestone head of a male wearing a" diadem "decorated with rosettes"—dated 550-525 BC, funerary stele in the shape of a lotus flower, scarabs.

These items are from the Cypro-Geometric and Cypro-Archaic Periods to the early phases of the Classical Period.

Wall mounted text tells about excavations including those at Larnaca-Mnemata—part of the necropolis of Kition.

=== Room IV ===
Items on display include imported items of Black-figure pottery and imported Attic Red-figure pottery: a "bell-shaped crater with a representation of a symposium scene"—found at Kition; an "oinochoe with female musicians"—found at Larnaca-Mnemata; a "cup with incised cypro-syllabic signs on its base"; "ceramics of the Cypro-Classical Period"; locally made vases of the period" including "a hydria, amphoriskoros with vertical handles noted for their particularly symmetrical shape"; ceramics of the Hellenistic Period, including several lagynoi, kantharos, "Two shallow dishes from a Hellenistic tomb at Alykes" that had "contained fishbones—tomb offerings to the deceased", "Black Glazed amphoriskos from Aradippou", "Red and Black Glazed perfume containers"; ceramics of the Roman Period: vases—Roman Red Slip ware, a pointed amphora, an oinochoe—from 4th -5th century AD, "sculptural groups" and terracotta figurines: limestone sculptures from Cypro-Classical Period (4th century BC—from Arsos: [of] "a female head with a conical head-cover and a wreath of rosettes", a "young maiden with a head band, strongly reminiscent of Attic sculptures", a "theatre mask from Kition", a "terracotta figure of the Tanagra type", a "statue of Priapos"—dated to 2nd or 3rd centuries AD; a "fragment of a clay mold used for relief work"; a "statuette of a musician"; oil lamps—closed lamps and open ones, including lamps "that imitates a shell—very characteristic of Cyprus from the Geometric to Classical Period" (That type was "re-introduced in the Medieval Period in a glazed form"); vases in alabaster; perfume containers—alabastron and various others "with lids of excellent workmanship"; an oil filler "for filling up the lamps with oil"; perfume containers of blown glass—from Roman Period, from Aradippou; lamps dated 1st century BC-1st century AD;

The copper and iron finds from the Early Bronze Age to Late Bronze Age include weapons, tools and vessels. Other finds include sling bullets, bull's protome, "iron weapons, arrow heads, spears, chains, scrapers, copper mirrors and other ornaments".

Coins exhibited include a silver coin from Kition, dated 449-425 BC—the reign of king Azbaal.(Previous coinage of the city, are displayed as dummies—with photocopied obverse and reverse; the original coins are at Cyprus Museum.) Coins from "the Larnaca Hoard"—according to the exhibit sign—are also there.

== See also ==
- Pottery of ancient Cyprus

== Bibliography ==
- Flourentzos, P. (1996). A Guide to the Larnaca District Museum. Ministry of Communications and Works - Department of Antiquities. ISBN 978-9963-36-425-1.

== Literature ==
- South, A.; et al. (1989). Vasilikos Valley Project 3: Kalavasos Ayios Dhimitrios II, Ceramics, Objects, Tombs, Specialist studies. Gothenburg: SIMA Vol. LXXI:3.
- Åström, P.; et al. (n.d.). Hala Sultan Tekke. Gothenburg: SIMA Vol. XLV.
- Gass, A. (1991). "La Stele Magique Egyptien de Kition-Bamboula". RDAC.
- Flourentzos, P. (1990). "Excavations in an Archaic Necropolis at Ay. Theodoros, Larnaca District". RDAC: 111–20.
- Nicolaou, I. (1989). "More information about the Arsos (Larnaca Districts))". RDAC.
- Ποτάγα, Α. (1985). Αναφορά στον Ζήνωνα τον Κιτέα. Lefkosia: Πρακτικα του Β Διεθνούς Κυπρολογικου Συνεδρίου. pp. 459–65 [sic].
