= Marki Alonia =

Marki Alonia is a prehistoric settlement in central Cyprus. Excavations were carried out at the site between 1990 and 2000 by David Frankel and Jennifer Webb of La Trobe University. These showed that it was occupied from the earliest phase of the Early Bronze Age (about 2400 BCE) until well into the Middle Bronze Age. It is the most extensively excavated site of the period, and the only one with a long sequence of occupation, which provides evidence for the development of the Philia culture.

The household compounds consisted of rectilinear buildings constructed using rectangular mould-made mud-bricks set on substantial stone foundations with associated open courtyards. There were changes in the size and structure of houses and the layout of the village as a whole. In the earlier periods, buildings were less complex with fewer interconnected rooms. Later houses commonly had three or more rooms. Especially in the later buildings, there was a strong continuity of orientation and alignment of walls, some of which were retained in use through several building episodes, while others were entirely removed.

The settlement began as a very small village which gradually expanded as the population increased from a founding group of forty or fifty people in about 2400 BCE to some 400 inhabitants some 400 years later in Middle Cypriot I.

Marki was primarily an agricultural village. The archaeologists found large quantities of animal bones. A little over half were from sheep and goats, with cattle, deer and pig and donkeys making up most of the remainder. The sheep and goats were probably kept primarily for meat rather than milk and wool. Cattle were at least as important as sheep and goats, providing more meat and milk, as well as having other uses, such as pulling ploughs. Only small quantities of seeds survive, sufficient to indicate a broad agricultural base, with fruits, such as grapes, olives and figs, nuts and legumes, and with wheat and barley as staple cereals.
