= Jennifer M. Webb =

Australian archaeologist

Jennifer M. Webb AM FAHA is an archaeologist who was born in 1953, in Melbourne, Australia. She currently holds a position as a Charles La Trobe Research Fellow at La Trobe University, a position she took in 2008. Recent research includes a volume covering documentation of tombs at Lapithos that had been excavated in the early 1900s, for which she was awarded a grant from the White Levy program.

== Education ==
Webb received her both her BA with Honors studying Classics and Ancient History, and earned her PhD from University of Melbourne with research related to ritual in Cyprus in the Bronze Age. Her dissertation, entitled Ritual Architecture, Iconography and Practice in the Late Cypriot Bronze Age was updated and published in 1999.

== Career ==
Webb was appointed to the University of Adelaide in 1982 to replace Alf French as coordinator of the Greek History course. She resigned after four years to return to Melbourne and start a family.

Webb started working at La Trobe University in 1998 as an Australian Research Council Fellow, and changed positions in 2003 to a Senior Research Associate, whose studies and practice have led her to extensive knowledge regarding Cyprus in the Bronze Age.

She has co-directed 4 excavations on Cyprus between 1990-2008, and her earliest work at Marki-Alonia and Marki-Davari resulted in a publication over 350 pages with a significant number of illustrations and maps in Studies in Mediterranean Archaeology.

Webb was also featured in a film screening in reference to her work in Marki during an exhibition featuring Bronze age art back in 2012.

Webb is also a co-editor-in-chief, with David Frankel, in the journal Studies in Mediterranean Archaeology.

== Awards and recognition ==
Webb received the Centennial Medal in 2001 and was elected a Fellow of the Australian Academy of the Humanities in the same year. In the 2017 Queen's Birthday Honours she was made a Member of the Order of Australia for "significant service to education, particularly to archaeology, as an academic, researcher and author, and to the community".

== Publications ==
Jennifer Webb has contributed over a dozen articles and chapters to "Studies in Mediterranean Archaeology." These include Corpus of Cypriote Antiquities 20. Cypriote Antiquities in the Nicholson Museum at the University of Sydney, and Corpus of Cypriote Antiquities 18. Cypriote Antiquities in Australian Collections I.

Her collection of published journal articles from 2000 on adds up to over two dozen, many of which were produced with D. Frankel, the co-director in multiple excavations. A sample of these include Pottery production and distribution in prehistoric Bronze Age Cyprus. An application of pXRF analysis, which was published in the Journal of Archaeological Science, New Evidence for the origins of textile production in Bronze and Cyprus, published in Antiquity, and Cultural regionalism and divergent social trajectories in Early Bronze Age Cyprus, in the American Journal of Archaeology

Taking into account the 28 editions published in a ten year period and its availability in both English and Italian, her most popular work would be Marki Alonia: an Early and Middle Bronze Age town in Cyprus: excavations 1990-1994.
