= Pottery of ancient Cyprus =

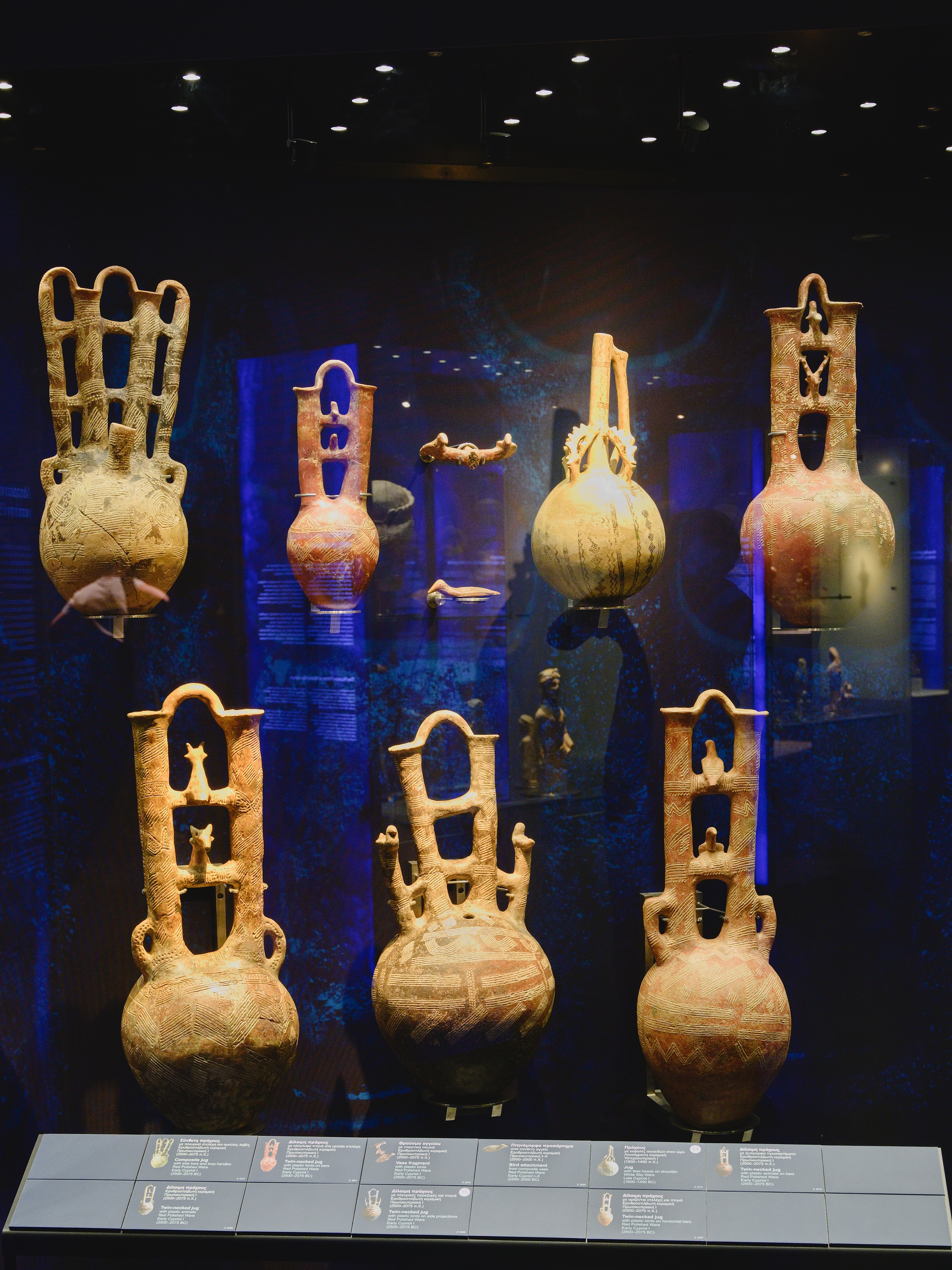
Twin necked jugs of the early Cypriot I period around 2500–2300 BC, Museum of Cycladic Art.

The pottery of ancient Cyprus starts during the Neolithic period. Cypriot ceramics demonstrate many connections with cultures from around the Mediterranean. During the Early and Middle Bronze Ages, it is especially imaginative in shape and decoration. There are also many early terracotta figurines that were produced depicting female figures.

The typo-chronology of Cypriot pottery for the Iron Age was established by Einar Gjerstad based on material excavated by the Swedish Cyprus Expedition. Gjerstad divided the Iron Age into three periods, the Cypro-Geometric (1050–750 BC), the Cypro-Archaic (750–480 BC) and the Cypro-Classical (480–310 BC), which are in turn subdivided;CG I–III, CA I–II and CC I–II. Each period corresponds to one pottery type, with a total of seven, Types I–VII. The exact dates of the chronology of Gjerstad have been slightly revised following more current research. The typochronology is explained in his main work Swedish Cyprus Expedition IV, 2. The Cypro-geometric, Cypro-archaic and Cypro-classical Periods (1948) with further remarks made in the article Pottery Types, Cypro-Geometric to Cypro-Classical (1960).

== Neolithic Age ==
The earliest widely used ceramics during the 5th millennium BC are of the dark faced burnished ware type. This ceramic technique was followed by the following techniques:

- Red on White ware
- "Combed ware"
- Painted and Combed ware, a combination of the two previous types

== Bronze Age ==
"Red Polished Ware" has been found from the start of the Bronze Age in Cyprus.

White-slip Ware was made c. 1600 – c. 1200 BC.

Base-ring Ware is also considered to be a "typical Cypriot" ceramic "of the Late Bronze Age".

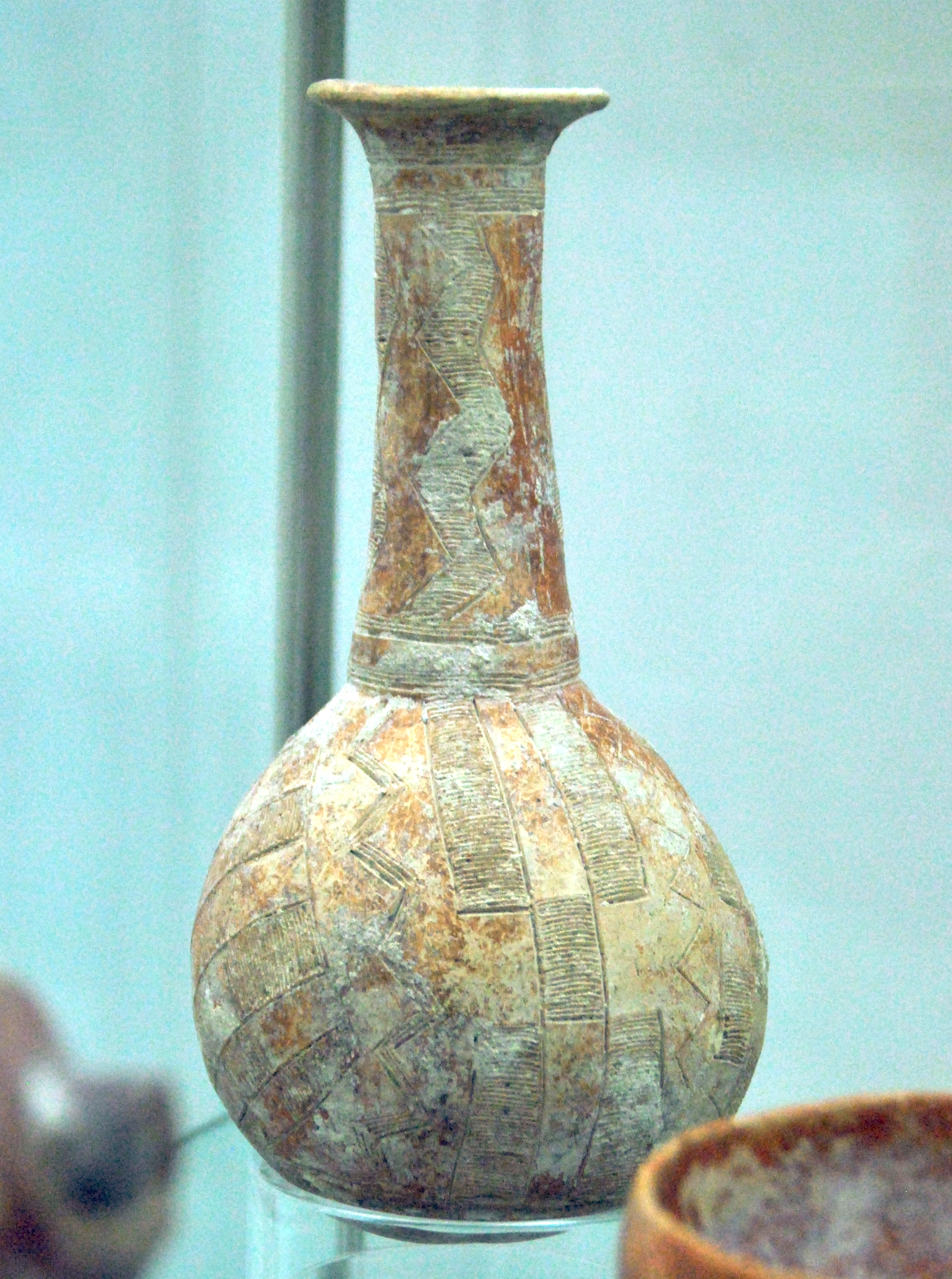
Cypriot Red Polished Ware II–III, 2200–1700 BC. Kiel, Germany

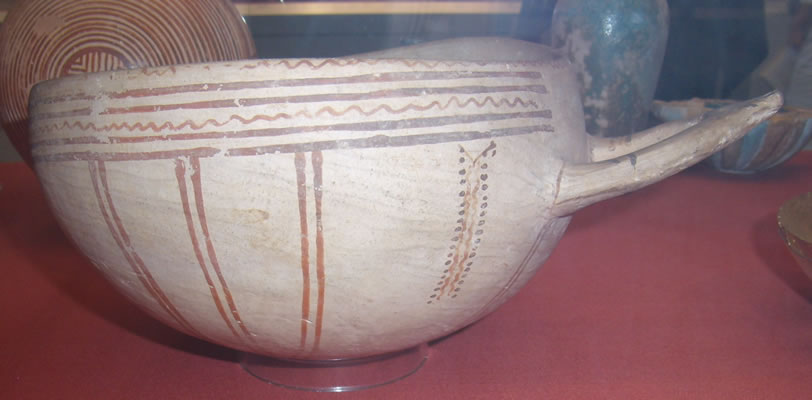
Cypriot White Slip I Ware. British Museum

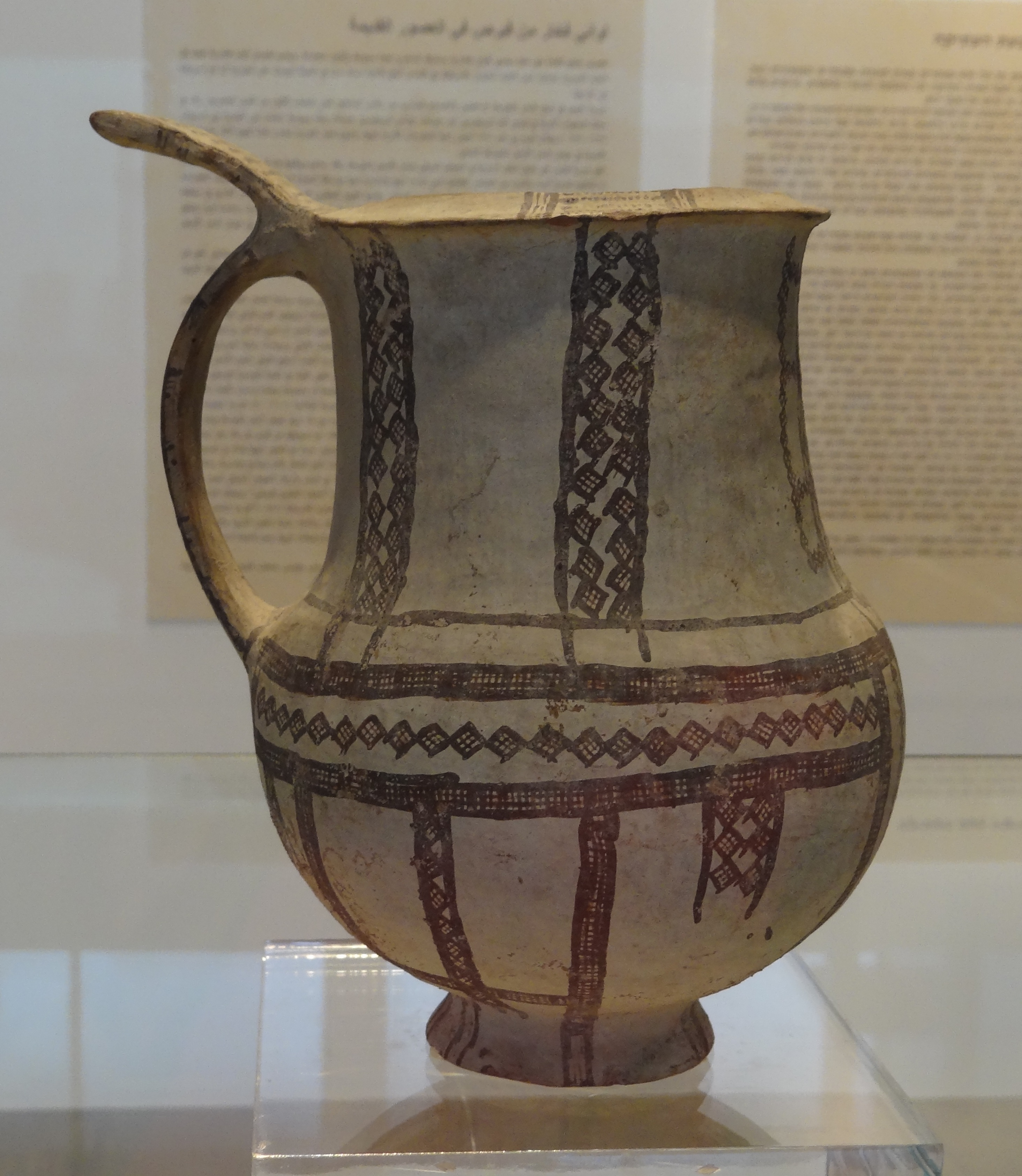
White Slip II Ware—14th–13th centuries BC
^{Israeli National Maritime Museum, Haifa}

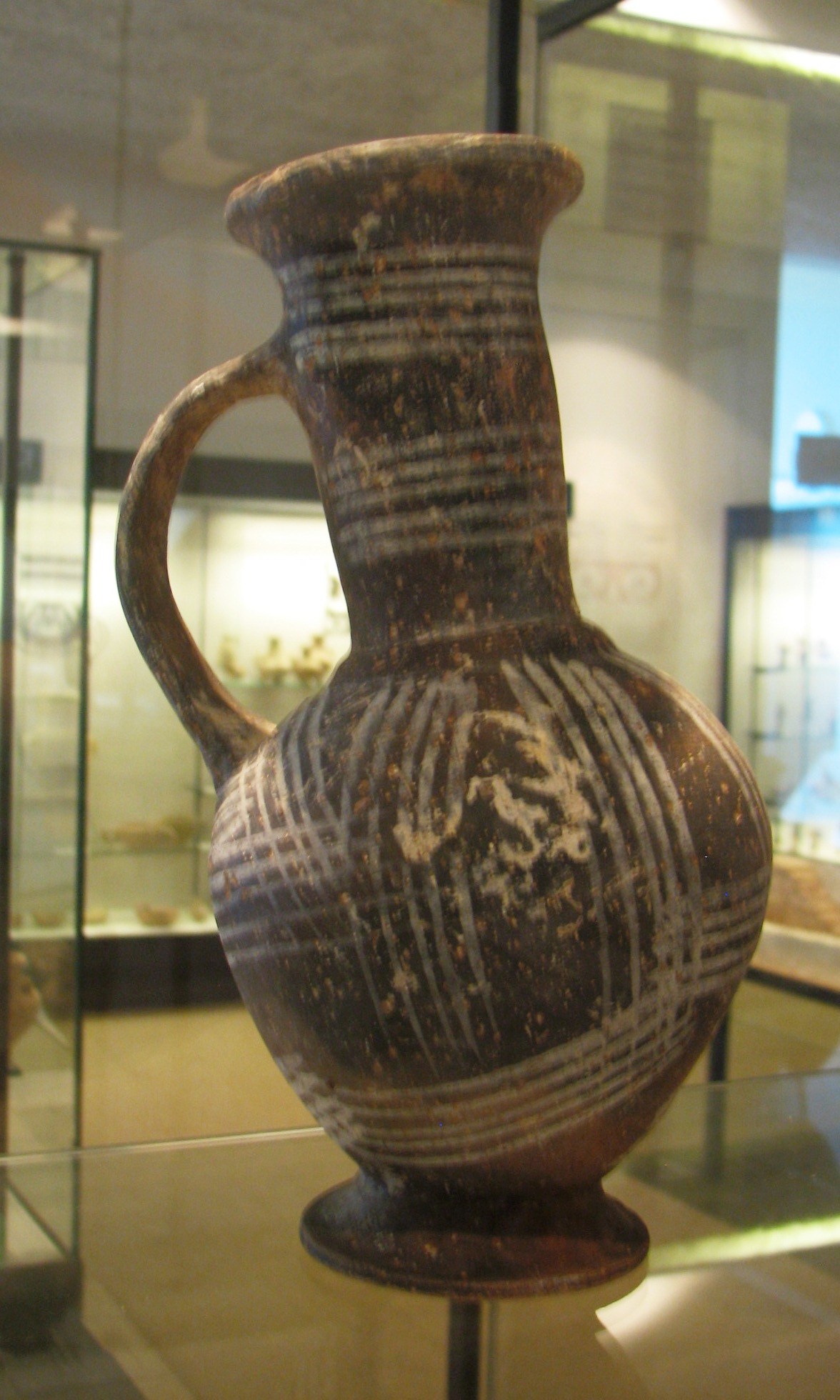
Cypriot Base Ring Ware, Late Bronze Age. Hecht Museum

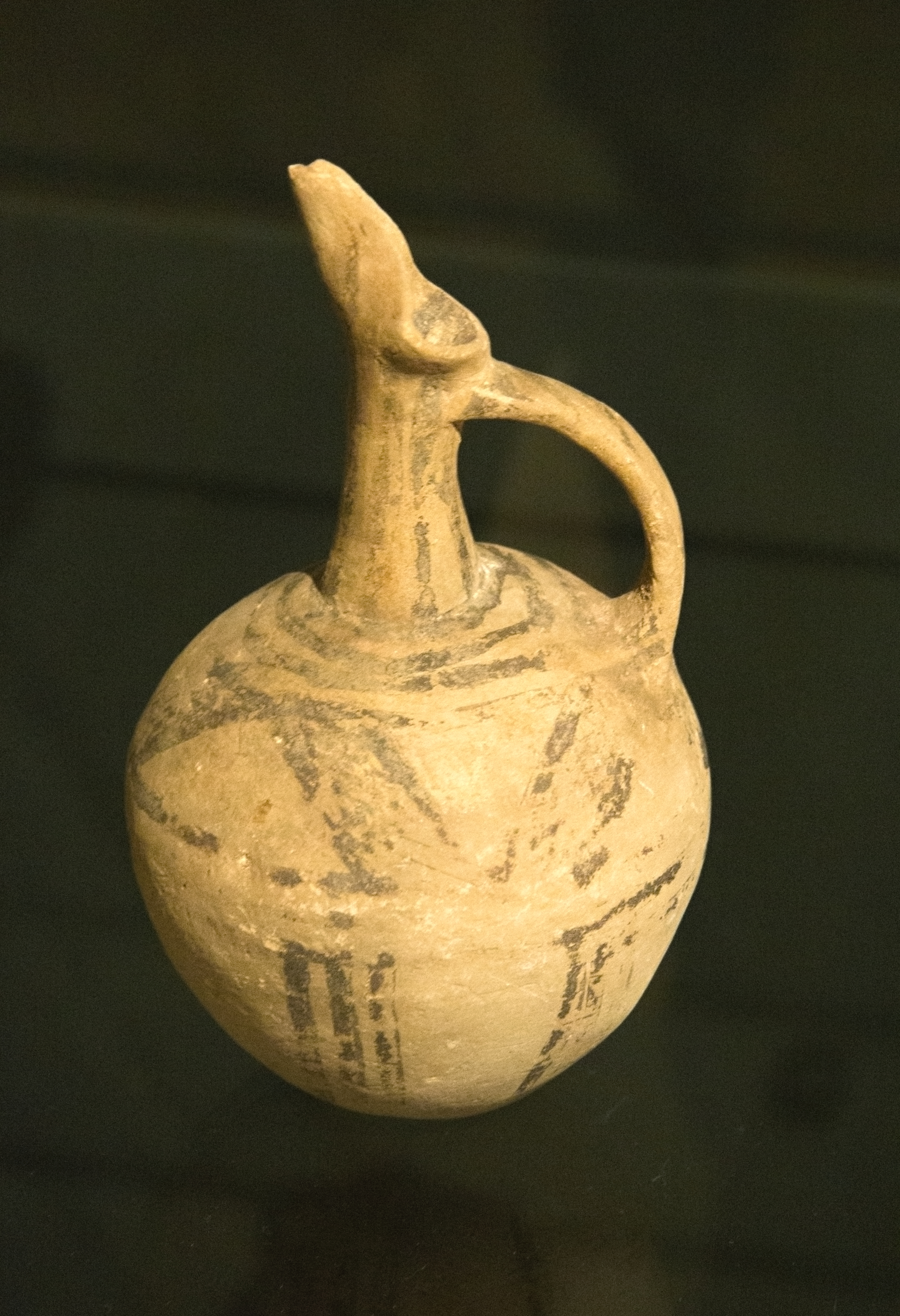
White painted jug (1500–1450 BC)

== Early Iron Age ==
During the Iron Age the pottery was "colorful and often elaborately painted with geometric or figural motifs. Intricate 'Free-field' compositions graced juglets and jars. Ubiquitous concentric circles were applied to jars, juglets, bowls and kraters using multiple brushes. Finer wares like plates, bowls and jugs were made on the fast wheel, while larger forms like amphoras, amphoroid kraters and pithoi were built with a combination of techniques: wheel throwing, hand coiling or molding."

=== Cypro-Geometric I ===
From 1050 to 950 BC, characteristic pottery were

- "White Painted I"
- "Bichrome I Ware"
- "Plain White I"
- "Black Slip I"
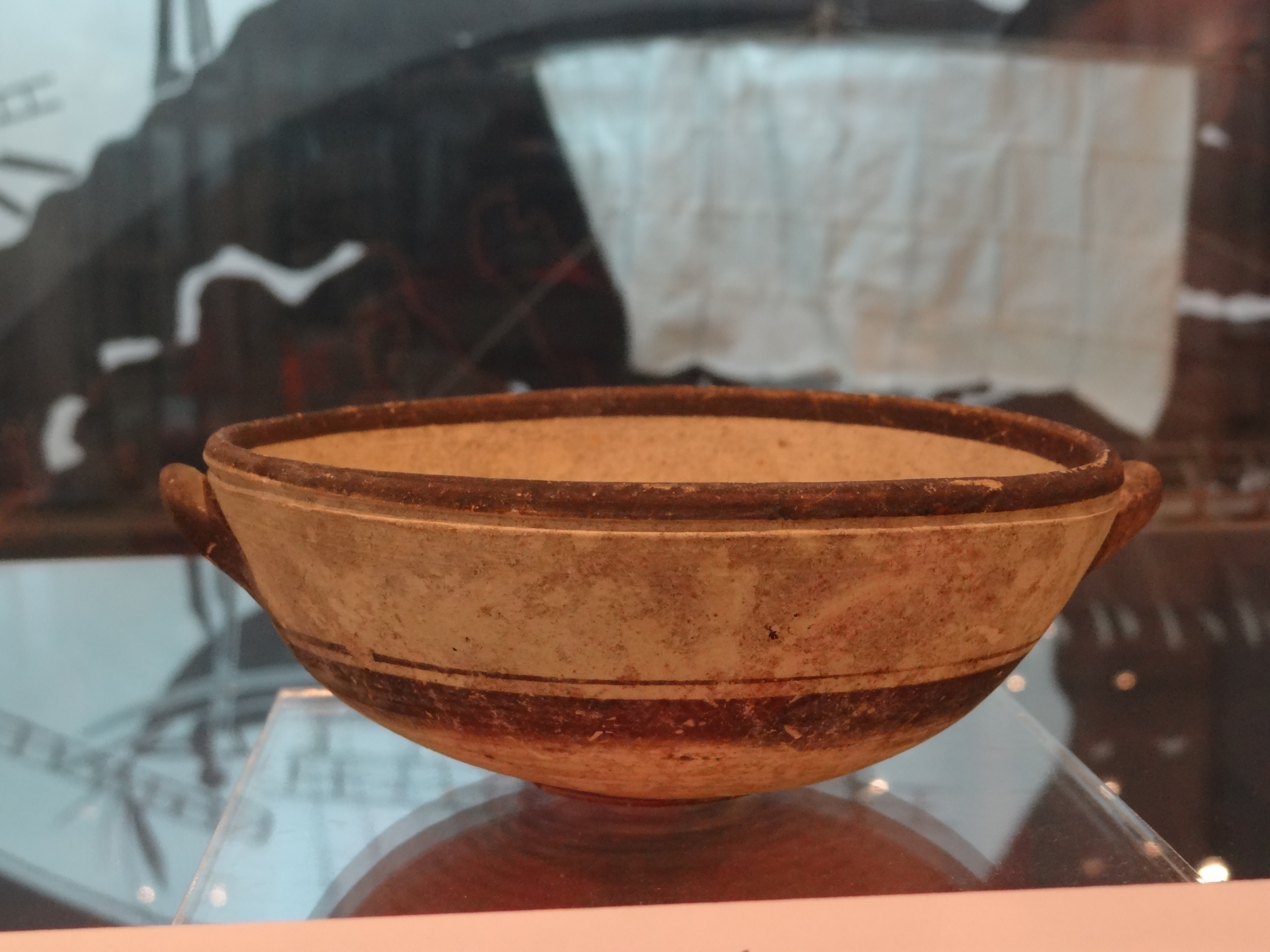
Cypriot White Painted I Ware, Iron Age. Israeli National Maritime Museum

=== Cypro-Geometric II ===
From 950 to 900 BC, characteristic pottery were

- "White Painted II Ware"
- "Bichrome II"
- "Plain White II"
- "Black Slip II"

=== Cypro-Geometric III ===
From 900 to 750 BC, characteristic pottery were

- White Painted III Ware
- Bichrome III
- Plain White III
- Black Slip III
- Red Slip I
- Black on Red I
- Grey & Black Polished I

=== Cypro-Archaic I ===
From 750 to 600 BC, characteristic pottery were

- White Painted IV "Free-field Style"
- Bichrome IV "Free-field Style"
- Plain White IV
- Black Slip IV
- Red Slip II
- Black on Red II
- Grey & Black Polished II
- Bichrome Red I
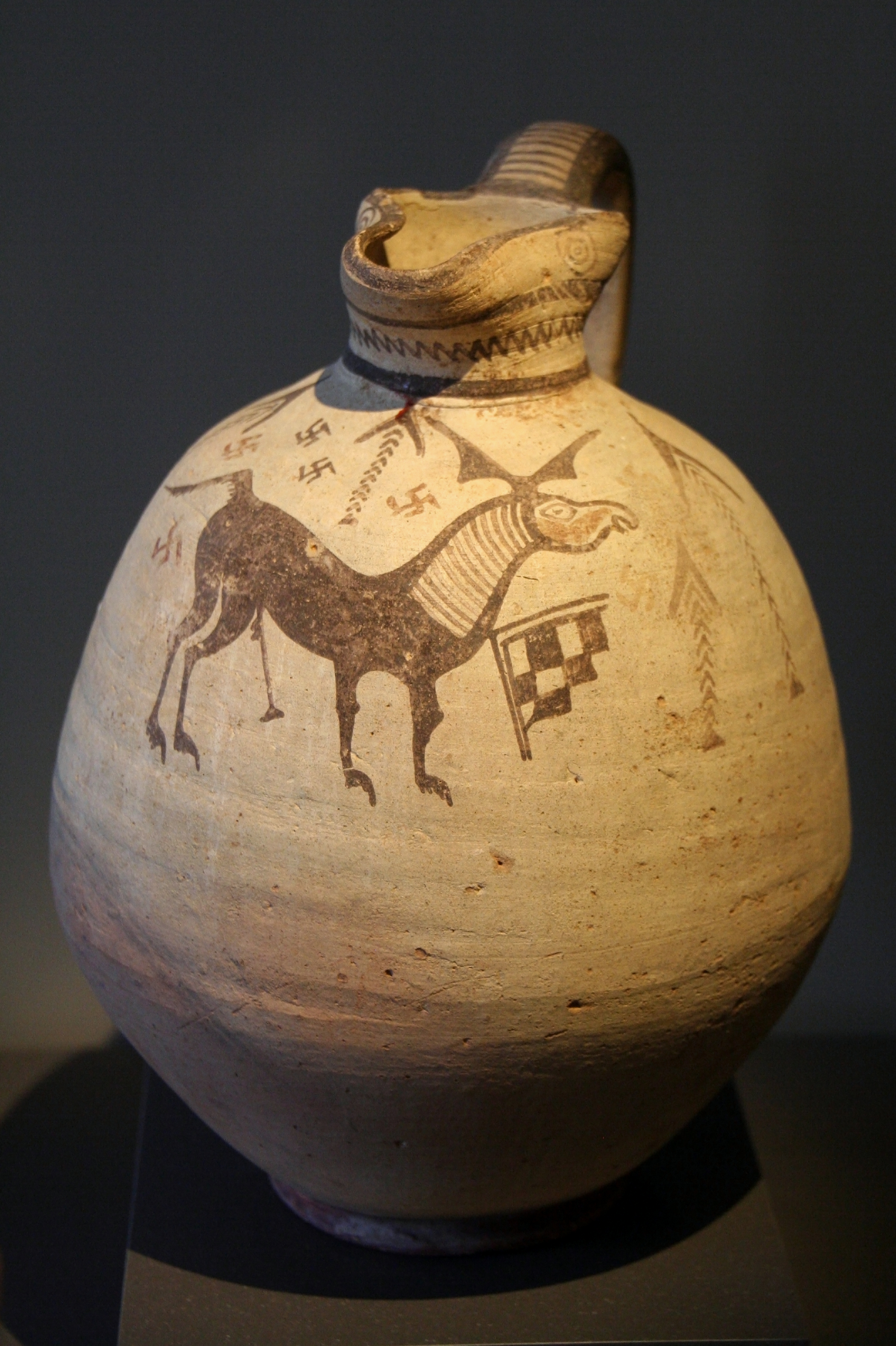
White-painted IV Ware: jug (8th century BC – 6th century BC) Neues Museum

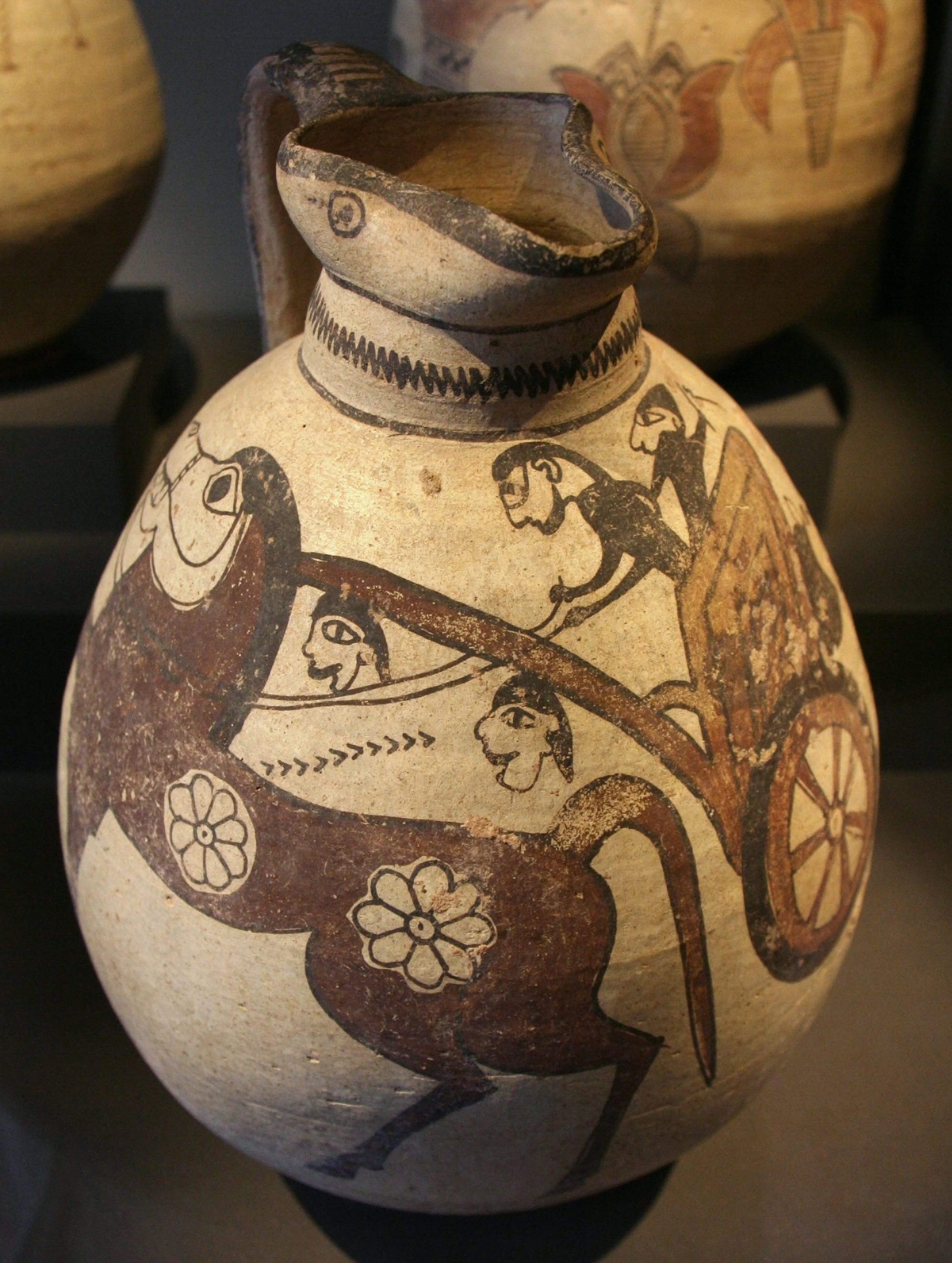
Cypriot Bichrome ware. Jug with Scenic Decoration, 8th–6th centuries BC. Neues Museum, Berlin

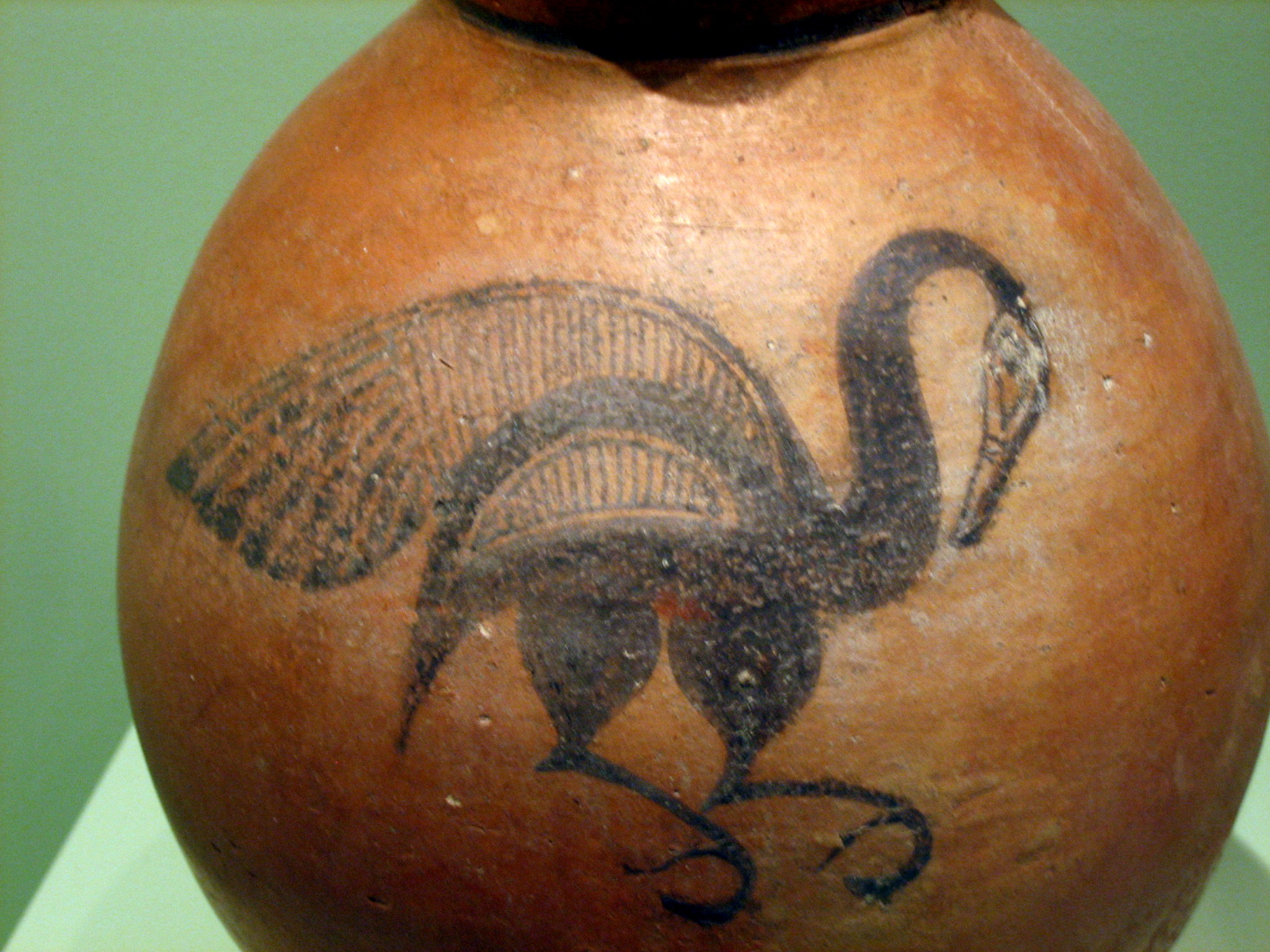
Black on Red II Ware, 750–600 BC
^{Museum of Cycladic Art at Athens, Greece}

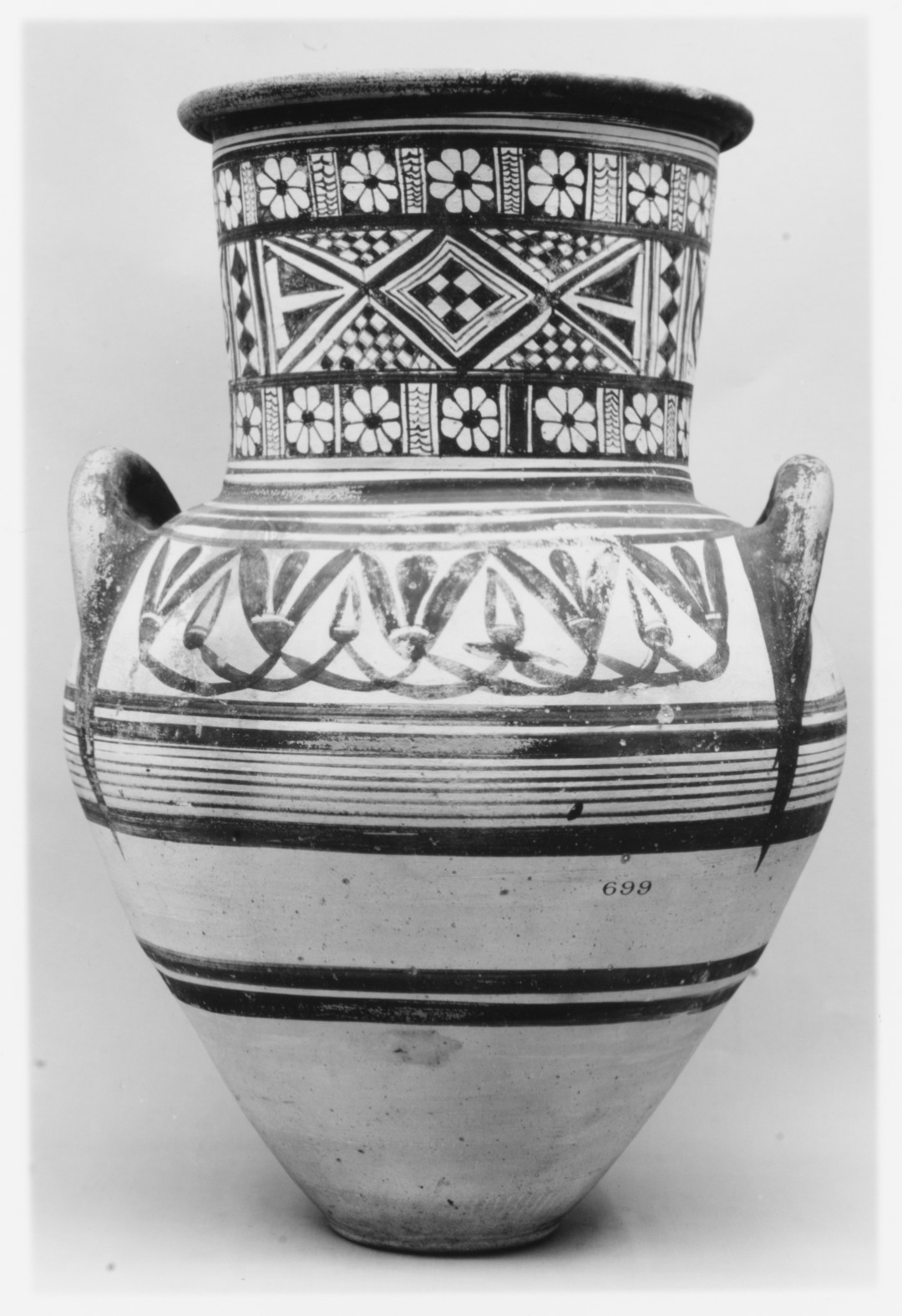
Cypro-Archaic I: Amphora (750–600 BC) Metropolitan Museum of Art

=== Cypro-Archaic II ===
During the period 600–480 BC, characteristic pottery were

- White Painted V Ware
- Bichrome V
- Plain White V
- Black Slip V
- Red Slip III
- Black on Red III
- Bichrome Red II
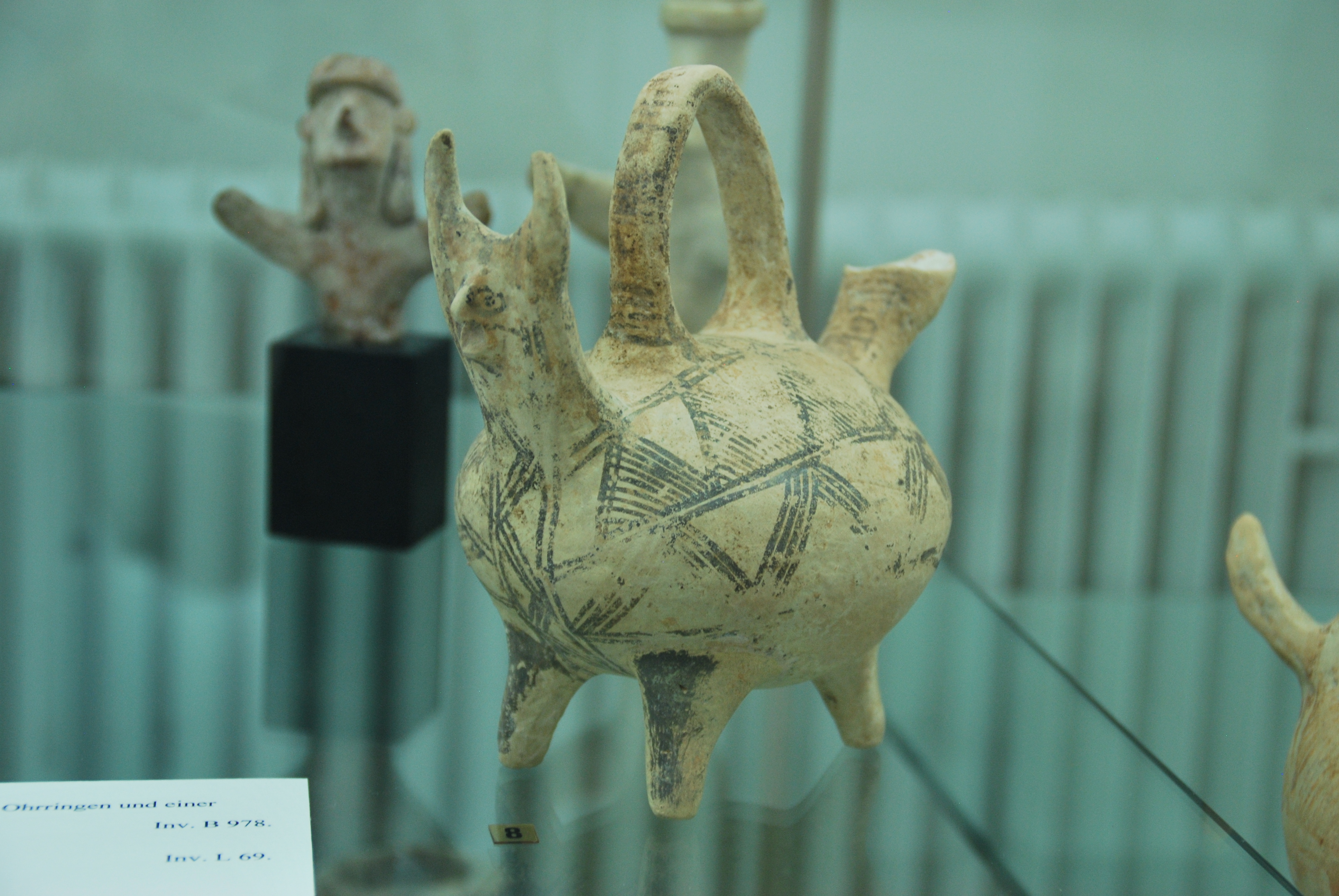
"White-painted V" Ware: vessel shaped like an animal; between 1900 and 1650 BC. Antikensammlung Kiel

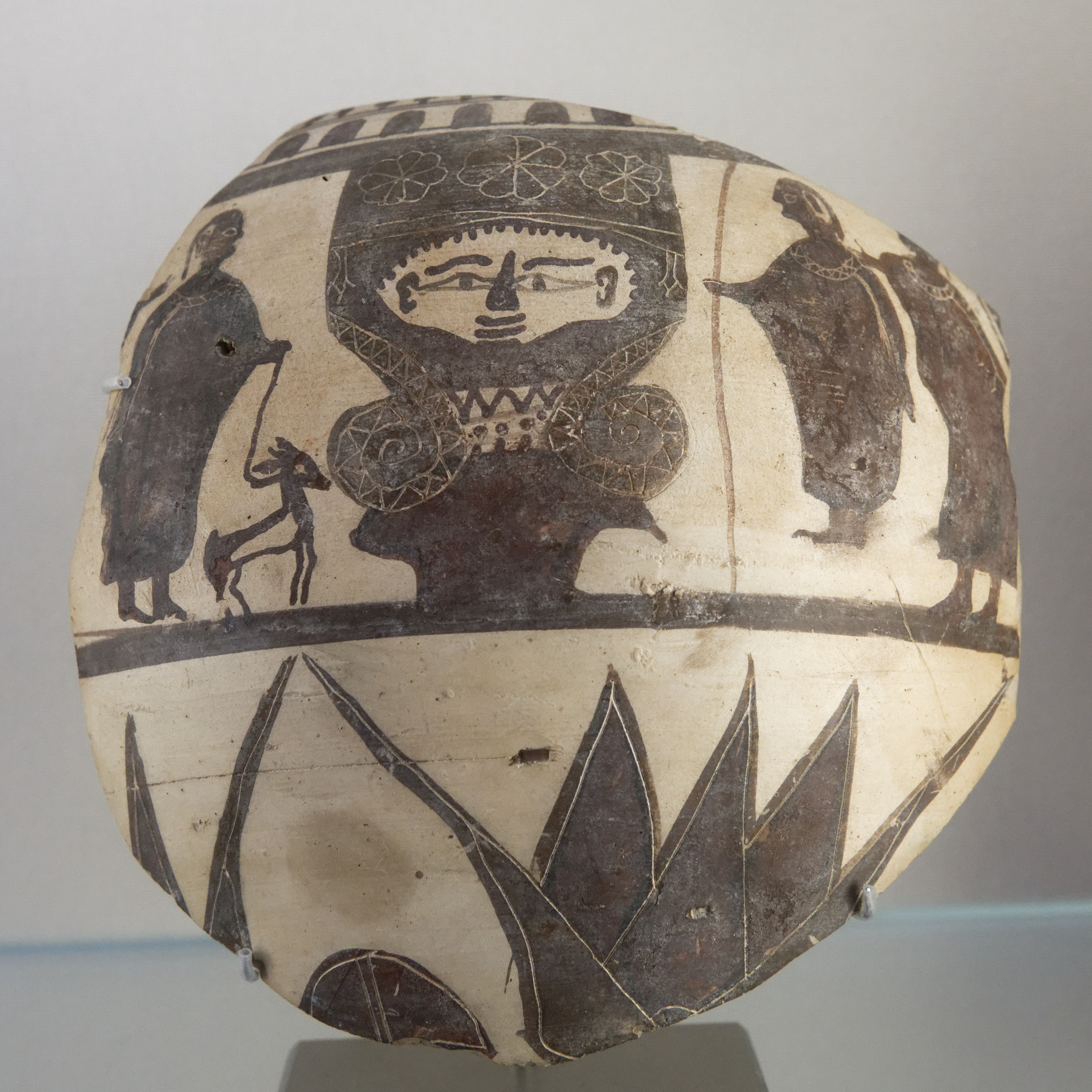
Amphora fragment with Hathoric stele, Cypro-Archaic II (7th–5th century BC). Louvre

=== Cypro-Classical I ===
From 480 to 400 BC, characteristic pottery were

- White Painted VI Ware
- Bichrome VI
- Plain White VI
- Black Slip VI
- Red Slip IV
- Black on Red IV
- Bichrome Red III
- Black & Grey Lustrous I
- Stroke Polished I
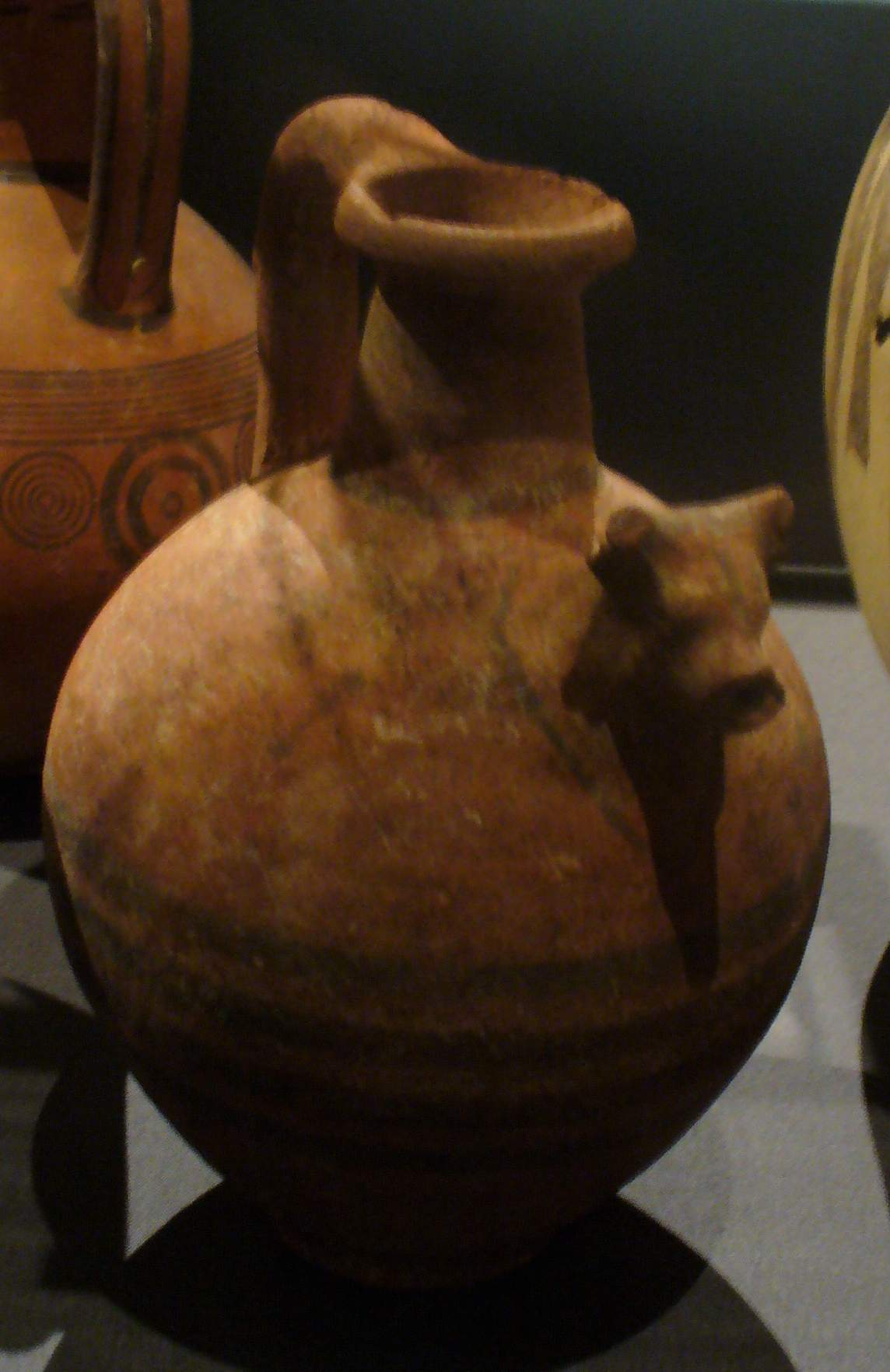
Bichrome Red III Ware; (600–480 BC);
^{Kunsthistorisches Museum, Vienna}

=== Cypro-Classical II ===
From 400 to 310 BC, characteristic pottery were

- White Painted VII Ware
- Bichrome VII
- Plain White VII
- Red Slip V
- Black on Red V
- Black & Grey Lustrous II
- Stroke Polished II
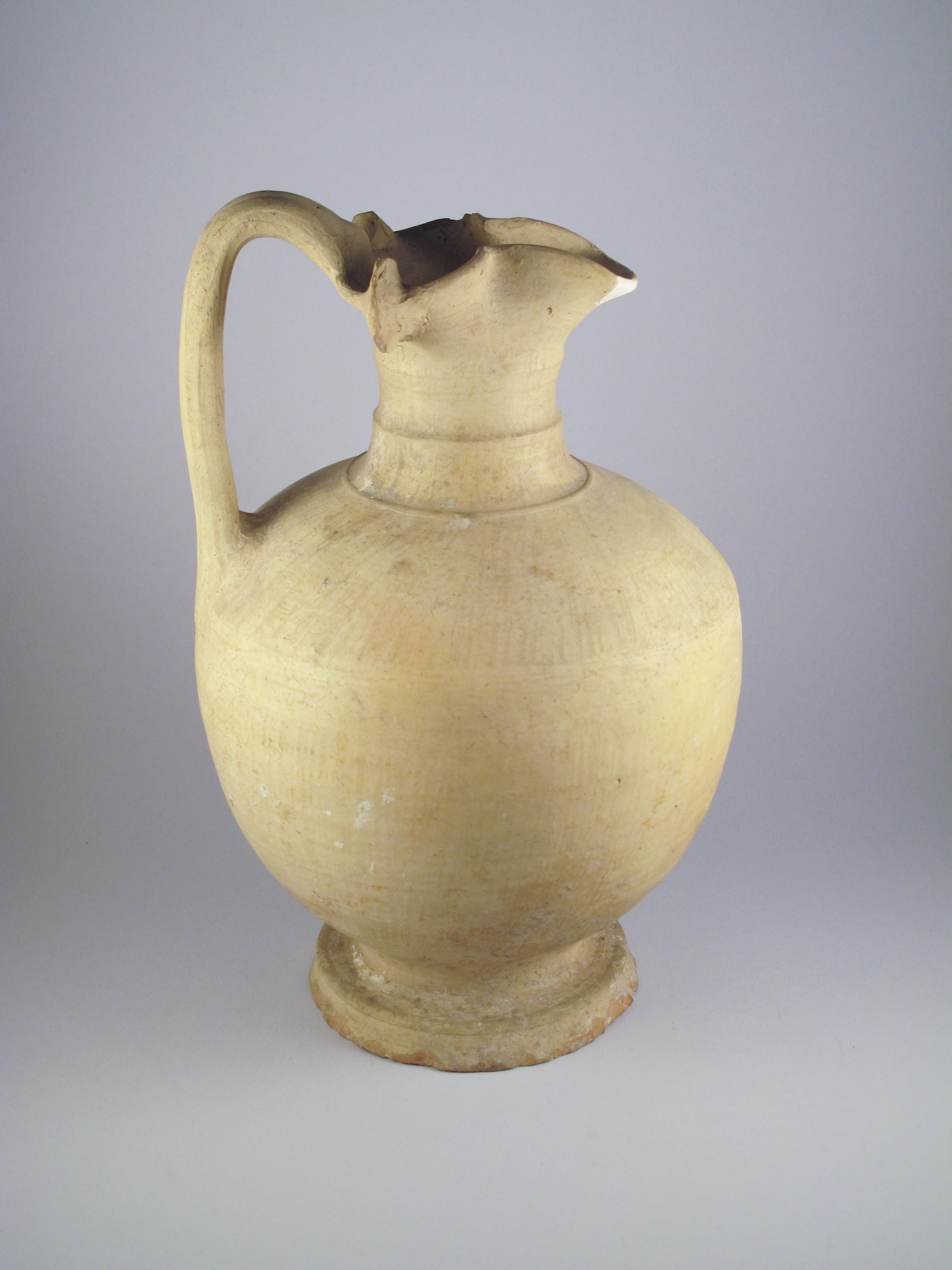
"Cypro-Classical II" Ware: Vase with moulded ridges about neck, of unpainted clay (480–310 BC) Metropolitan Museum of Art

== See also ==
- Larnaca District Archaeological Museum
- Cyprus Museum
- Pierides Museum (Larnaca)
- Pit–Comb Ware culture
- Slip (ceramics)
- Philia culture
- Ancient Cypriot art
