= Ancient Cypriot art =

Visual art of Cyprus from c. 10,000 BC to c. 330 AD

Ancient Cypriot art refers to all works of visual art produced in Cyprus from approximately 10,000 BC to 330 AD. Ancient Cypriot art attests to a full range of indigenous characteristics and of foreign influences as Cyprus emerged as a maritime trading hub in the Bronze Age and came under the influence or domination of Eastern Mediterranean powers including Phoenicia, Egypt, Greece, and Rome in later periods. Ancient Cypriot art is especially known for works of terracotta, stone, metals, glass, and gemstones.

== Neolithic ==
Human settlement of Cyprus began just before the start of the Near Eastern Neolithic (c. 10000–5500 BC). These first settlers originated from the coastal Levant or southern Anatolia, forming communities founded on agriculture. The end of the Neolithic period is marked by the emergence of pottery production; these early baked clay vessels were frequently embellished with abstract designs in red on a light slip.

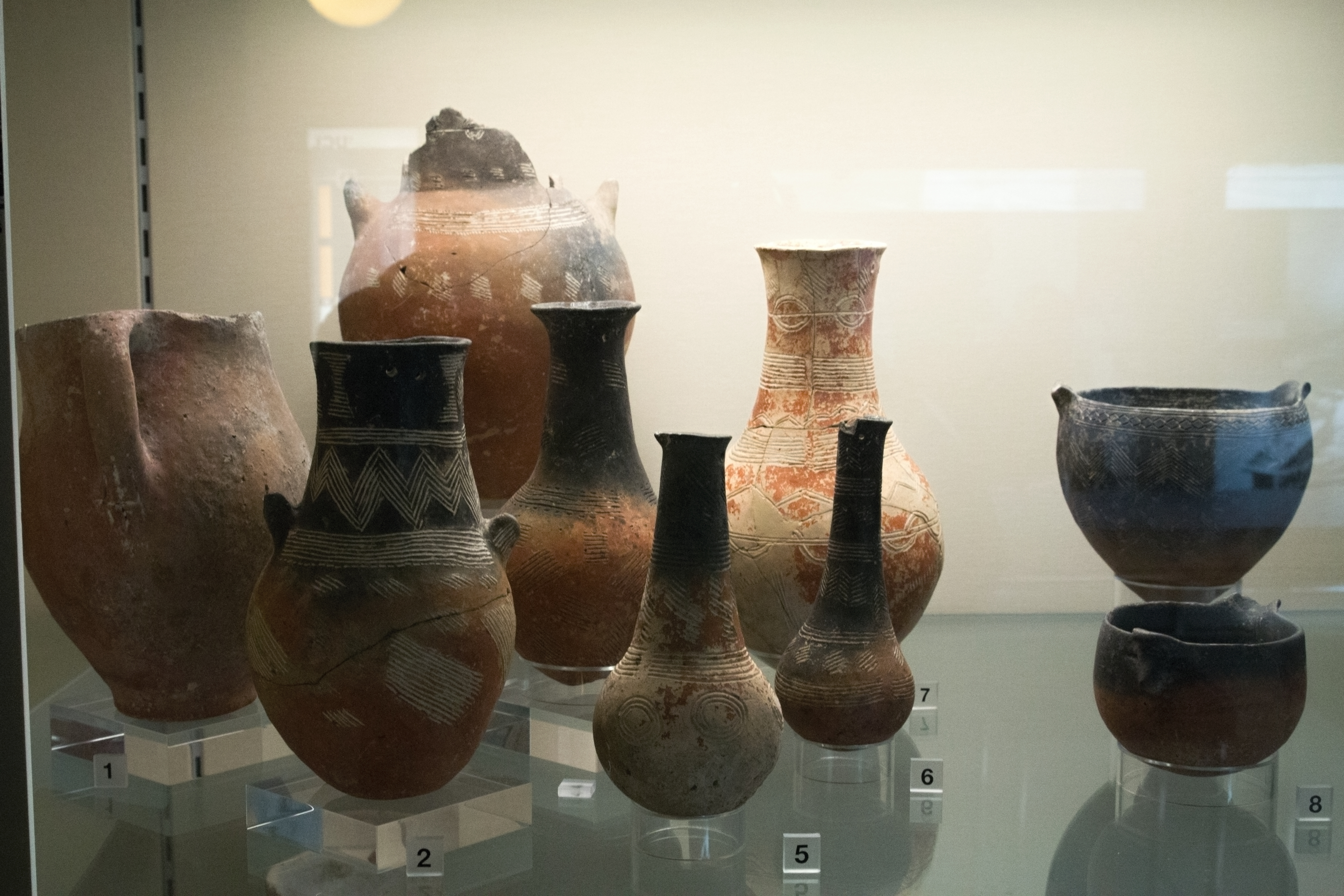
Pottery of the Early Cypriot I period (c. 2500 - c. 2075 BC)

== Chalcolithic ==
During the Levantine Chalcolithic period (dating varies, generally c. 4500–3500 BC), Cypriot artisans began to craft small implements and ornaments in hammered copper—chalkos in Greek—a metal abundant on Cyprus and which gave the period its name. The Chalcolithic was a time of critical transition as metallurgists discovered that soft copper could be alloyed with tin and other metals to produce bronze for weapons and tools. During this time, new waves of Levantine and Anatolian immigrants introduced their religious and material culture practices to local Cypriot cultures. Artifacts of this period include female figurines formed from clay or local picrolite with prominent genitals representing fertility. Diversified burial practices, the construction of religious sites, and the use of seals indicate increased social stratification and complexity.

== Bronze Age ==
=== Early Bronze Age ===
Migrations of Anatolian settlers marked the beginning of the Early Bronze Age (c. 3300–1900 BC) in Cyprus. Communities began to move, settling in areas of fertile land near sources of water.

By the late 4th millennium, Near Eastern metallurgists had developed the production of bronze—the metal that would give the period its name—marking the transition away from the Chalcolithic. Under Near Eastern influences, Cypriot polities standardised their procedures for mining, extracting, and smelting the island's rich copper ores. Copper would remain a major Cypriot export throughout the Bronze Age and into the Iron Age. While the island's societies remained primarily agricultural, Cypriot metallurgists began to manufacture their own unique weapons, tools, and ornaments towards the end of Early Bronze Age.

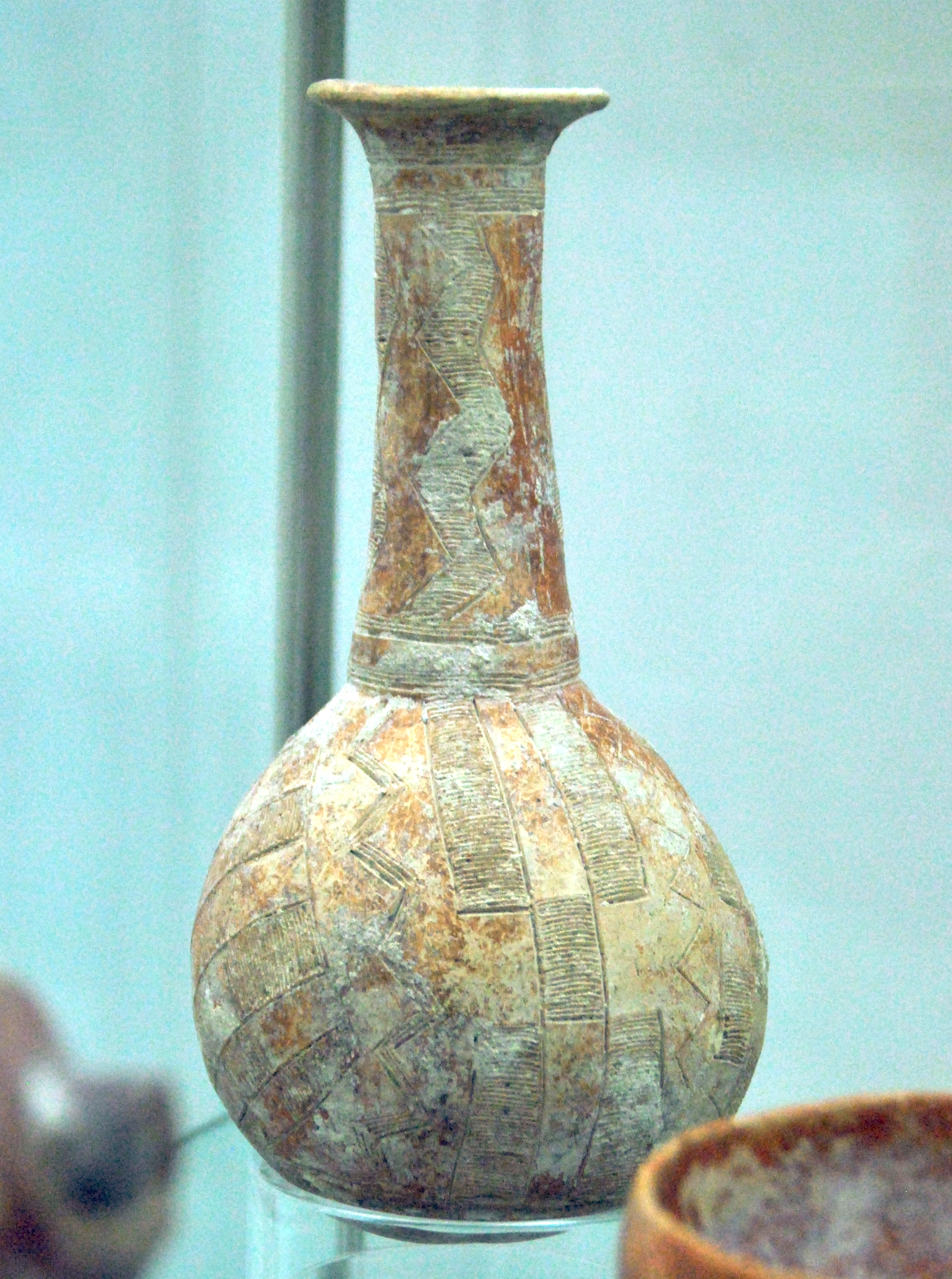
Red polished Cypriot flask (c. 2200 - c. 1700 BC)

=== Middle Bronze Age ===
In the Middle Bronze Age (c. 1900–1650 BC) Cyprus became a significant commercial hub in the extensive maritime trade network of the Eastern Mediterranean. The major Cypriot polity Alashiya had contacts with Egypt, the Near East, Minoan Crete, and Mycenaean Greece. Further social stratification and ensuing unrest is evidenced in wealthy burials and the construction of fortifications in many settlements.

Early and Middle Bronze Age material culture displays stylistic innovations unique to Cyprus. Terracotta was used extensively to produce statuettes for tomb burials. Other burial items include bronze weapons and tools; while cylinder seals and gold and silver jewellery became more common.

=== Late Bronze Age ===
In the Late Bronze Age (c. 1650–1150 BC), Cyprus was a major copper producer and home to several maritime trade and manufacturing centers. Recovered artifacts dated to the 14th century BC include alabaster and faience goods imported to Cyprus from Egypt and the ten tonnes of Cypriot copper recovered from the Uluburun shipwreck off the Anatolian coast. Mycenaean vessels from 14th century BC tombs and burial chambers are common archaeological finds.

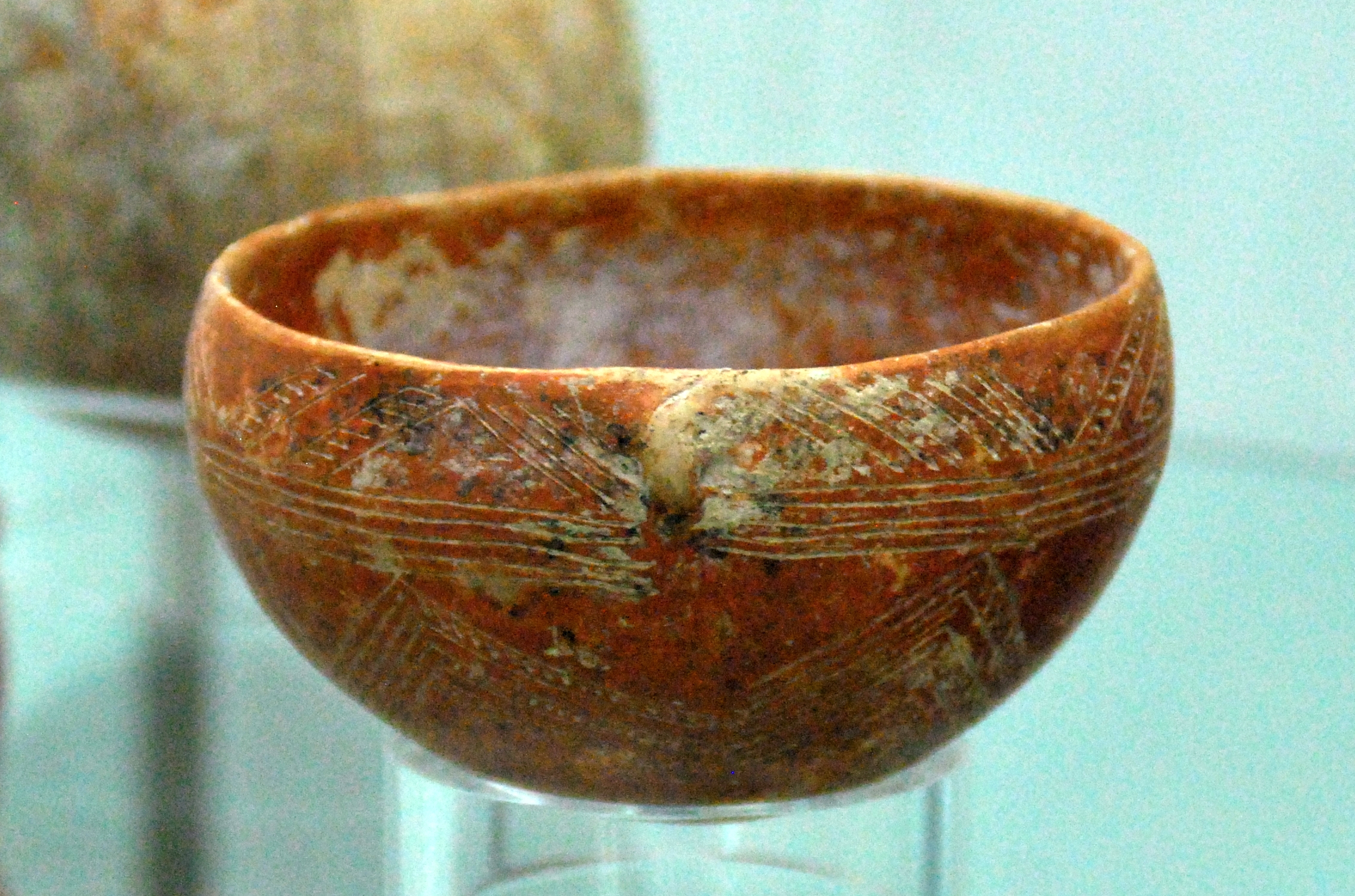
Cypriot vessel of the Red Polished Ware II-III period (c. 2200 - c. 1700 BC)

From around 1500 BC, Cypriots developed the undeciphered Cypro-Minoan script adopted from Crete, giving administrative authorities new tools to manage an increasingly complex society. This script can be seen on clay tablets and records found in cities such as Enkomi and Kalavasos.

Cypriot society remained relatively stable during the Late Bronze Age collapse of the late 13th and early 12th century BC.

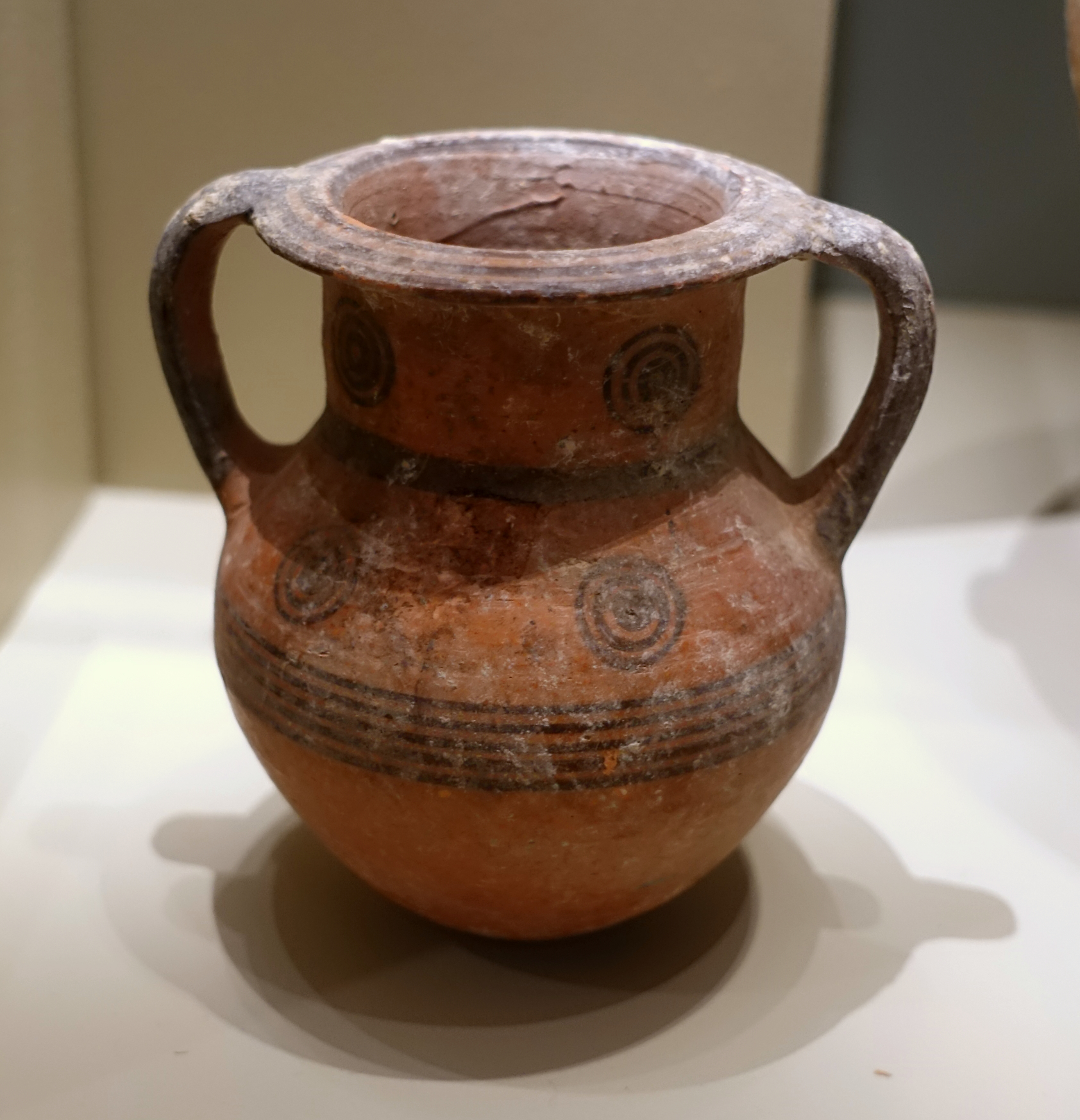
Terracotta from the Cypro-Geometric II-III period (c. 950 - c. 750 BC)

== Iron Age and Classical ==
=== Cypro-Geometric ===
Following the Late Bronze Age collapse, an influx of Mycenaean and other Greek settlers marked the beginning of the Cypro-Geometric Period (c. 1050–750 BC). Cypriot art of this period shows the influence of Mycenaean pottery, clothing, weaponry, burial customs, and the Greek language. Cyprus remained a major exporter of raw materials in the Mediterranean. The Cypriot syllabic script was developed in 11th century BC for the writing of ancient Greek and Eteocypriot; it was in until the 3rd century BC.

Cypriot polities which became known as "city-kingdoms" had emerged during the transition from the Bronze to the Iron Age. The establishment of a Phoenician colony at Kition on the southern coast in around 900 BC further pushed Cyprus’ trade as the Phoenicians were interested in the plentiful copper and wood resources for shipbuilding. There is evidence for the use of the Phoenician language, as well as the introduction of the cult of Astarte which may have influenced the Cypriot origins of Aphrodite-worship at Paphos.

Cypriot art of this time shows unique indigenous characteristics even as the island's city-states came under foreign influence. Pottery of this period was generally produced from Proto-White Painted Ware, but the Cypriots also painted in black-and-red.

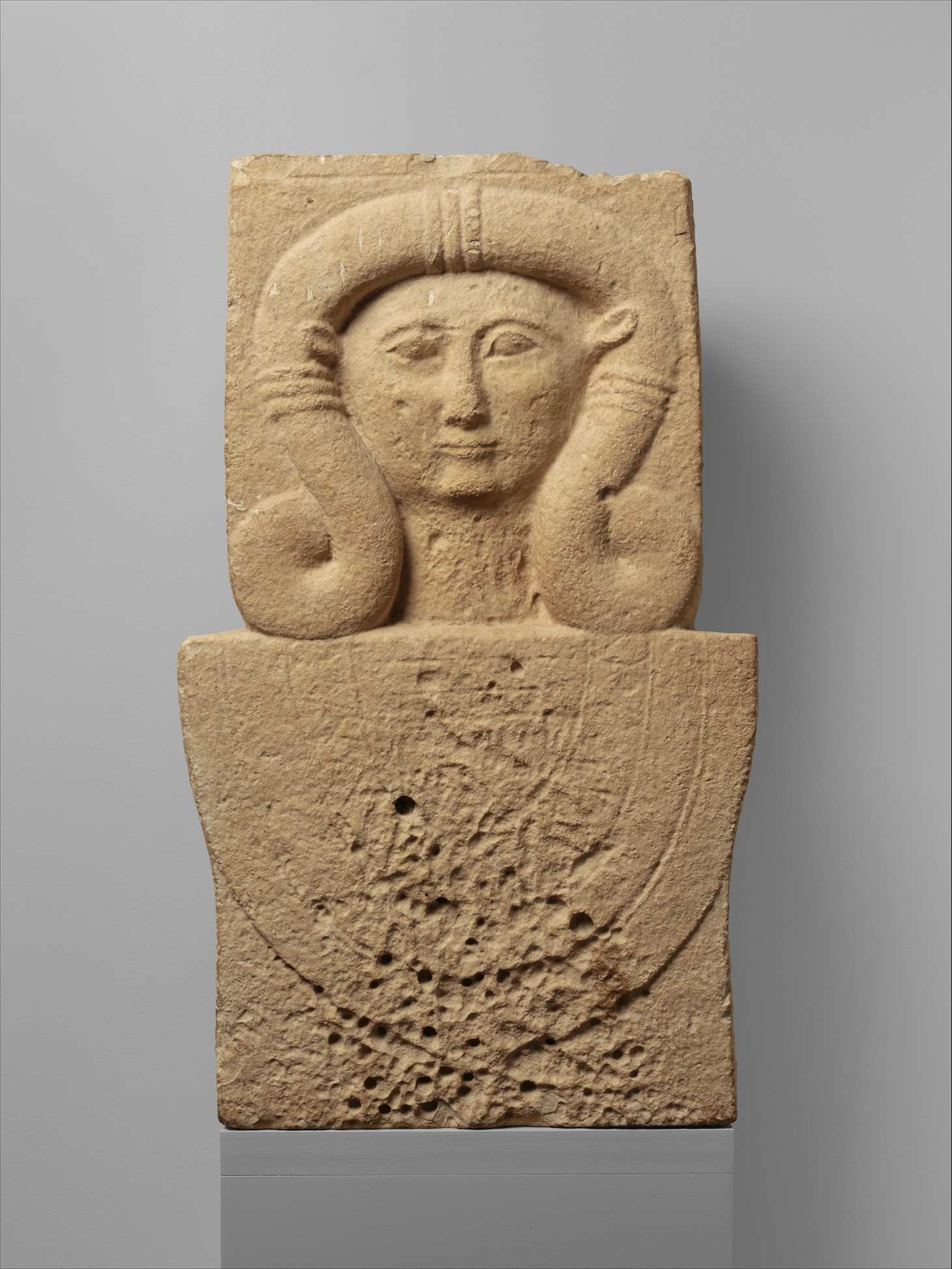
Limestone stele with the head of Hathor from Cyprus (c. 575 - c. 550 BC)

=== Cypro-Archaic ===
In the early Cypro-Archaic Period (c. 750–480 BC) Cypriot polities became client states of Assyria. Frequent tribute to Assyria bought relative autonomy. After a brief period of independence from 669–560 BC, Cyprus became subject to Egyptian rule. Cypriot art of this period shows incorporation of Egyptian iconography such as the head of Hathor found on pieces from Amathus. Cypriot sculpture in the Cypro-Archaic Period was characterised by the polychrome decoration used in Greece. Terracotta during this time was often painted, and mould innovations accelerated production. In 545 BC, Cyprus was conquered by the Achaemenid Empire. Cyprus remained prosperous as a trade hub, and religious practices did not change with the new Persian rule.

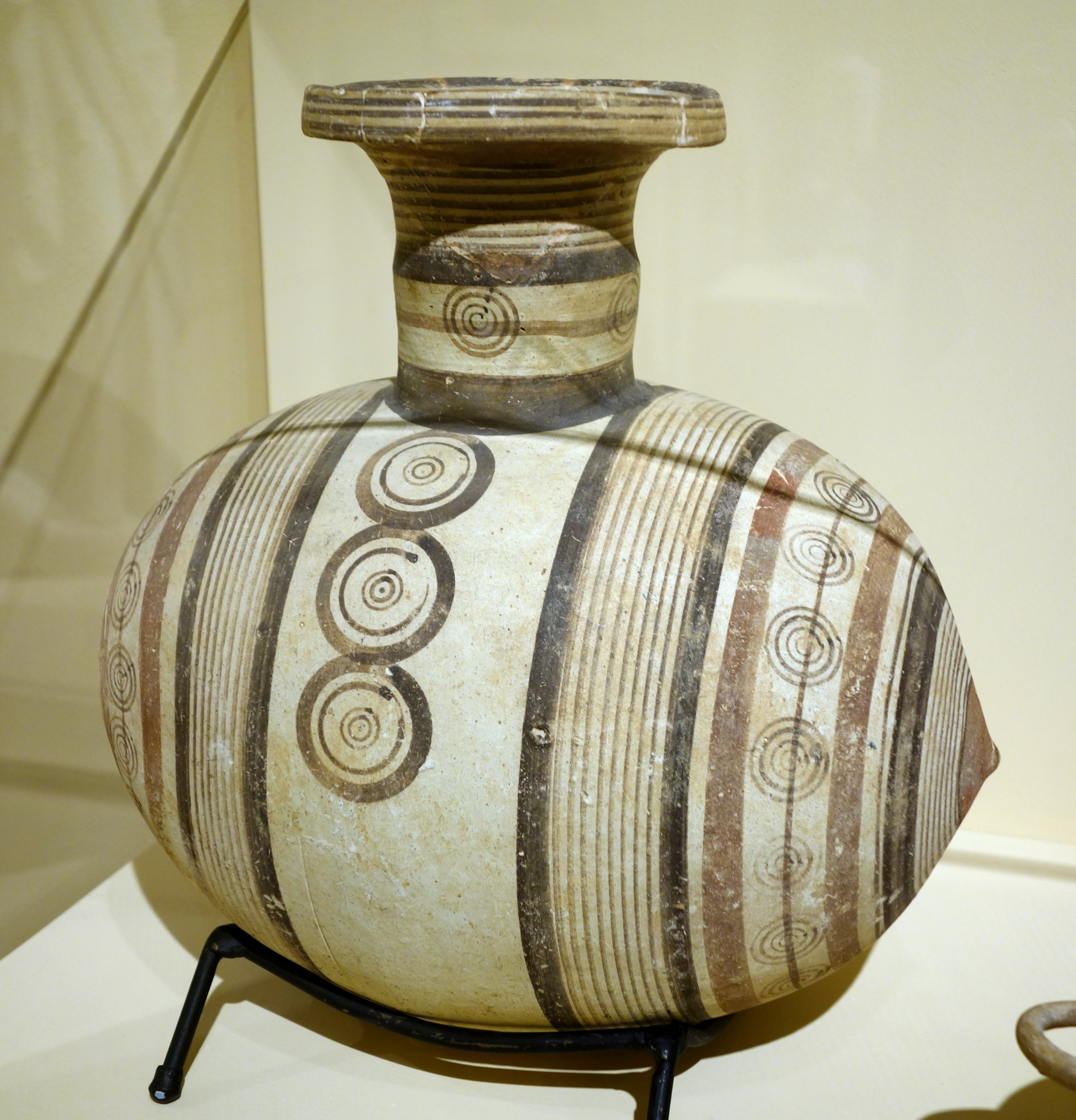
Ceramic barrel-shaped jug from the Cypro-Archaic I period (c. 700 - c. 600 BC)

=== Cypro-Classical ===
The Cypro-Classical Period (480–310 BC) saw the extensive Hellenization of the island. Cyprus was conquered by Alexander the Great in 333 BC. Sculptures in this period were generally made from terracotta or limestone. Cypriot art retained indigenous characteristics, evidenced by sarcophagus depicting Greek warriors with Cypriot motifs. Locally-produced kouroi sculptures dated to this time have been found on Cyprus.

=== Hellenistic and Roman Periods ===
In the Hellenistic and Roman Periods (310 BC–c. 330 AD), Cyprus became fully integrated with Hellenistic and Roman art styles .

== Collections ==
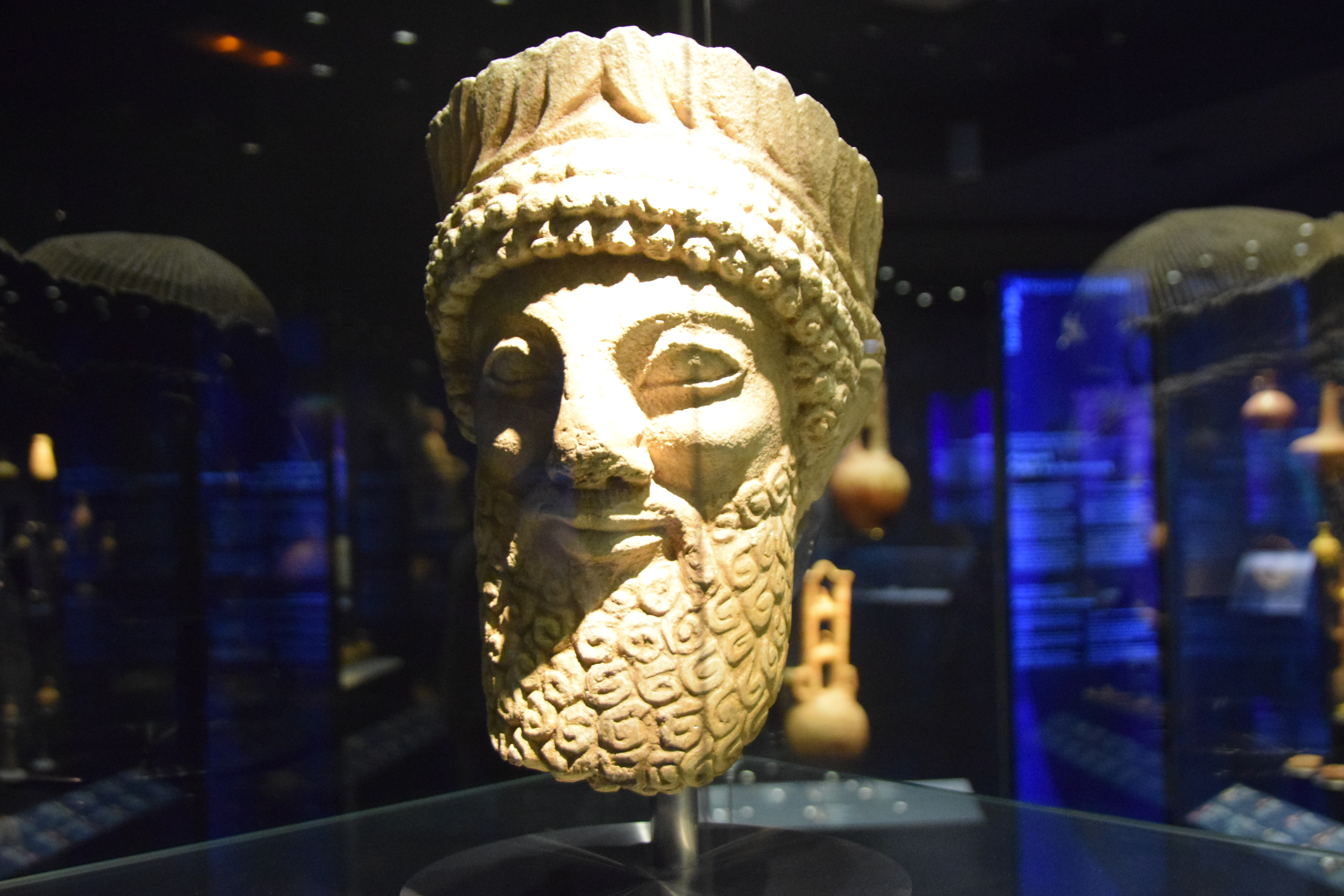
Classical Cypriot limestone head of a bearded man circa 480-400 BC, Museum of Cycladic Art, Greece.

There are extensive collections of ancient Cypriot art in museums in and outside of Cyprus, notably the British Museum and the Louvre. One of the largest is the Cesnola Collection of the Metropolitan Museum of Art, amassed by Luigi Palma di Cesnola (1832–1904), an archaeologist and diplomat and the museum's first director.

The Met auctioned off a portion of its Cypriot collection in 1928. American circus impresario and art collector John Ringling, acquired the majority of the sale. Consequently, the The Ringling Museum in Sarasota, Florida became home to one of the largest collections of Cypriot art in North America.

== See also ==
- Pottery of ancient Cyprus
- Ancient history of Cyprus
