= Comb Ceramic =

Type of pottery subjected to geometric patterns from the comb-like tool

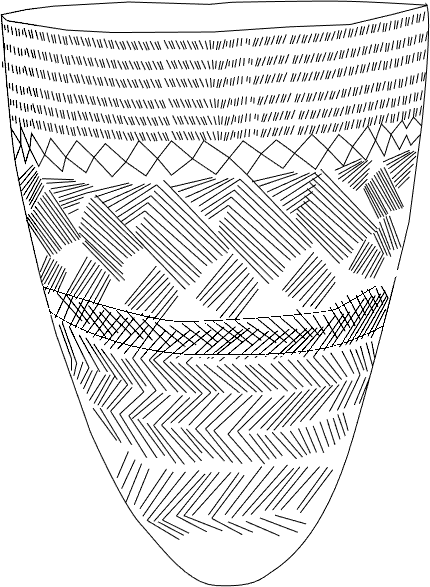
Comb patterns on a Jeulmun-style pottery.

Comb Ceramic or Pit-Comb Ware (in Europe), and Jeulmun pottery or Jeulmun vessel (in Korea) is a type of pottery subjected to geometric patterns from a comb-like tool.

The Comb Ceramic pottery was widely distributed in the Baltic, Finland, the Volga upstream flow, southern Siberia, Lake Baikal, the Mongolian Plateau, the Liaodong Peninsula, the Korean peninsula, and the Japanese archipelago.

== History ==
=== East Asia ===
==== China ====
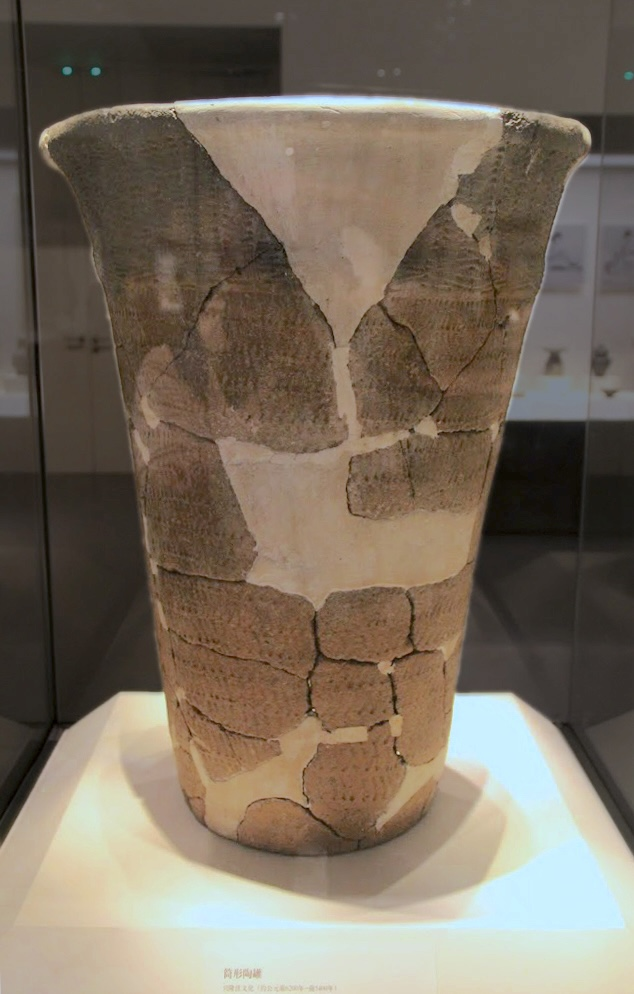
A reconstructed Xinglongwa-style pottery.

The oldest Comb Ceramic is found in the remains of Liao civilization: Xinglongwa culture (6200–5400 BCE).

The Xinglongwa culture was a Neolithic culture in northeastern China, found mainly around the Inner Mongolia-Liaoning border at the Liao River basin. Xinglongwa pottery was primarily cylindrical and baked at low temperatures.

The Xinglongwa culture also showed several signs of communal planning. At three Xinglongwa sites, houses were built in rows. Several Xinglongwa sites also featured a large central building. In addition, several Xinglongwa sites were surrounded by ditches.

Despite being the oldest Comb Ceramic discovered to date, it does not share any similarity with its other East Asian counterparts from Korea and Japan; therefore, it is considered to have evolved distinctly, making the Xinglongwa pottery a unique piece of artifact in the region.

==== Korea ====
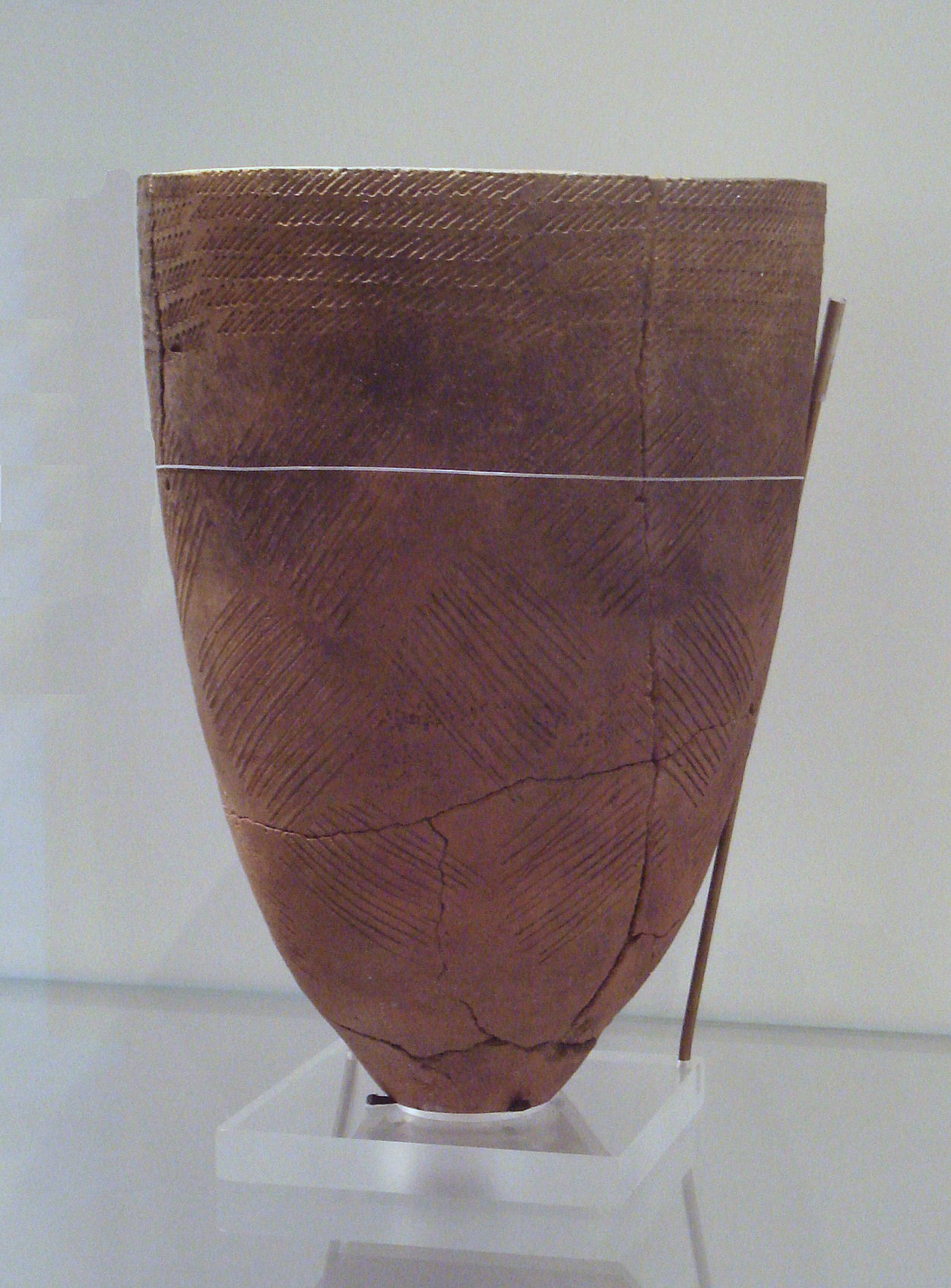
Jeulmun-style pottery.

During the Neolithic Age of Korea (circa 8000 BCE), people began farming, planting millet and other grains, and gradually began to settle down, forming a clan society.

They ground the stone into various grinding tools for use. Among them, the most representative of the characteristics of the Neolithic Age is the comb pottery, which is found all over the Korean Peninsula. Amsa-dong in Seoul, Namgyŏng in Pyongyang, and Ga-ri in Gimhae are representative sites of comb pottery.

The first knowledge of comb pottery on the Korean Peninsula began with Stone Age sites and relics found in the areas of Pyongan, Hwanghae and Gyeonggi provinces during a survey conducted by Torii Ryuko in 1916. Later, Fujita Ryusaku proposed the Northern system theory, which linked the lineage of carpeted pottery culture on the Korean Peninsula with that of Neolithic pottery culture in northern Eurasia. His theory of Northern genealogy had a major impact on the epistemology of Neolithic pottery in the academic circles of North and South Korea after the August 15 liberation, but has been repudiated by excavations and research at new sites since the 1980s.

Korea's Jeulmun pottery is best known for its distinct "Cross-hatched" or "Hashtag (#)" surface patterns that are found only in the region (and in early/middle Jōmon pottery of Japan).

==== Japan ====
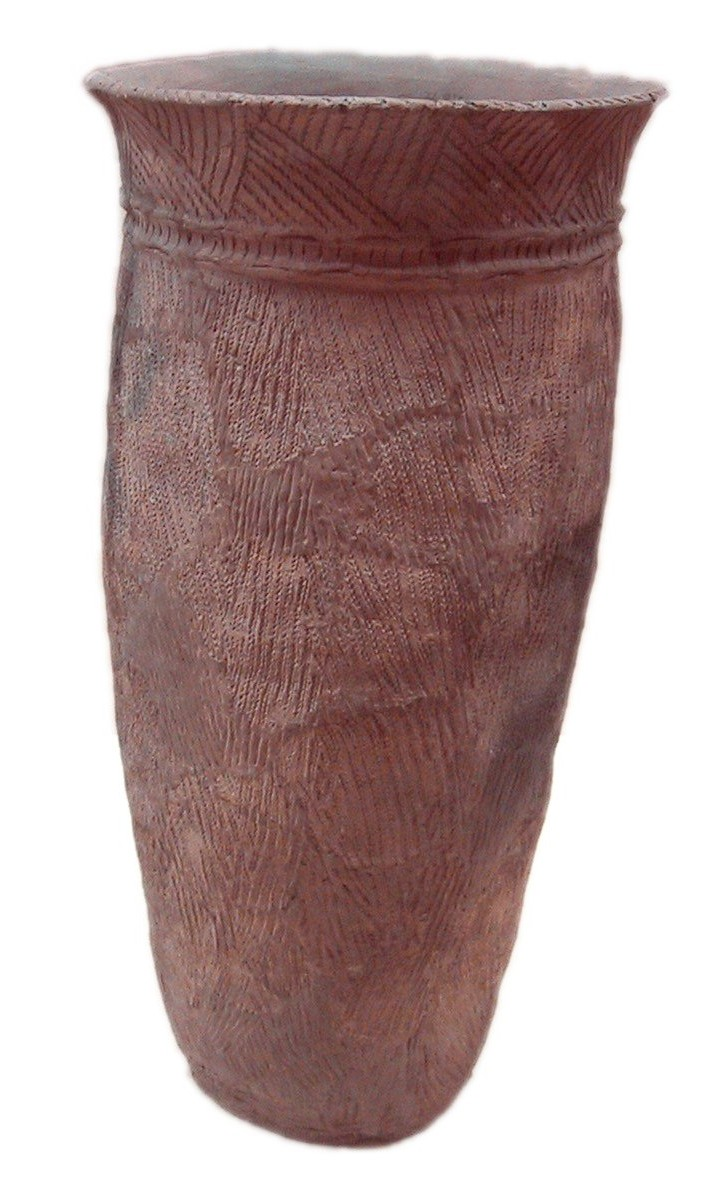
Early/middle Jōmon-style pottery.

Early Jōmon pottery show significant similarities with Korea's Jeulmun pottery as the early artifacts known as Sobatashikidoki (曽畑式土器), show significant similarity with the Jeulmun period pottery of Korea not only in the surface patterns (Cross-hatched/Hashtag), but also in the use of talc mixed into the clay giving it the signature brownish color.

However, unlike its Korean counterpart, the Jōmon pottery is not often considered as part of the Comb Ceramic group due to the drastic change the culture underwent after its early/middle iterations.

Despite starting similar, Korea's Jeulmun period is believed to have ended much earlier than Japan's Jōmon period (around 500 years) due to the incoming migrants while the Jōmon pottery styled continued to evolve over time.

=== Northeast Europe ===
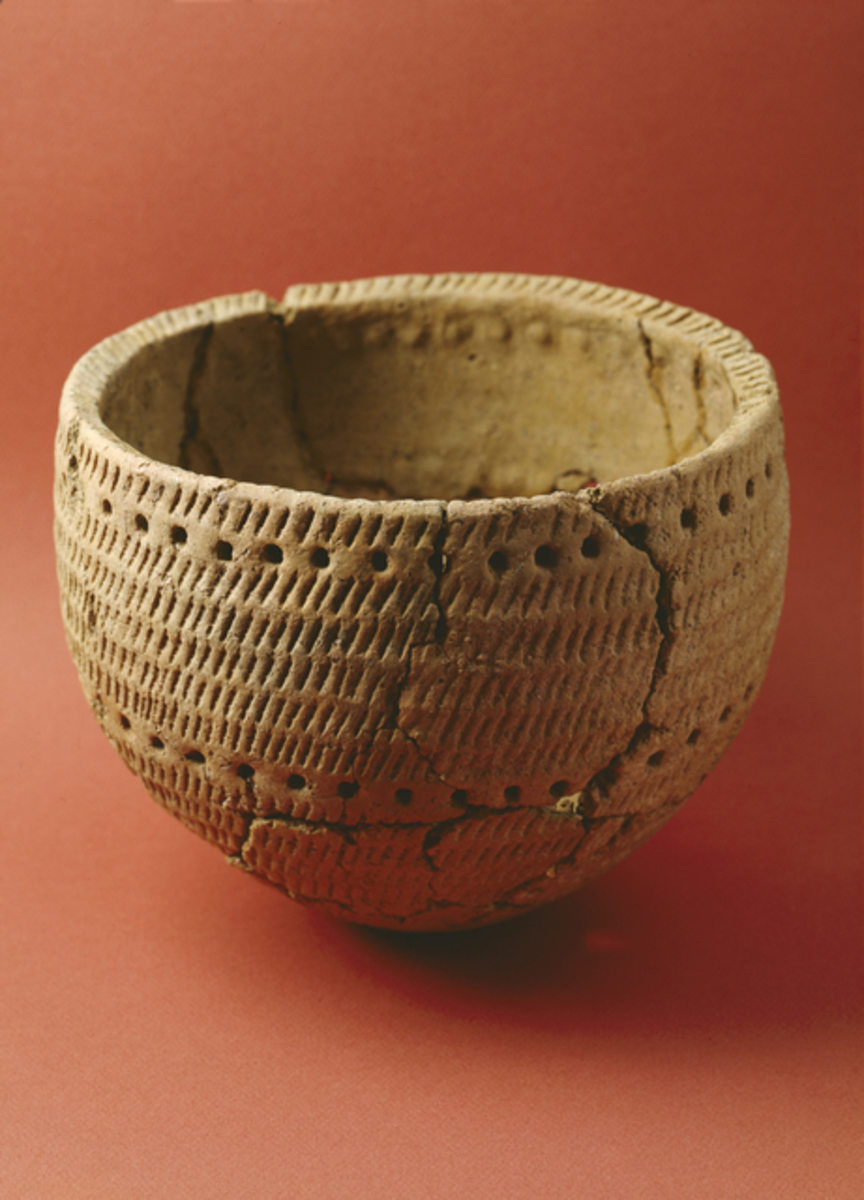
Comb ceramic pottery (Finland)

A similar pattern is found in the Northeastern European cultures and their relics.

The distribution of the artifacts found includes Finnmark (Norway) in the north, the Kalix River (Sweden) and the Gulf of Bothnia (Finland) in the west and the Vistula River (Poland) in the south. It would include the Narva culture of Estonia and the Sperrings culture in Finland, among others. They are thought to have been essentially hunter-gatherers, though e.g. the Narva culture in Estonia shows some evidence of agriculture. Some of this region was absorbed by the later Corded Ware horizon.

The bearers of the Comb Ceramic culture of Europe are thought to have still mostly followed the eastern hunter-gatherer lifestyle typical of the Mesolithic, with traces of early agriculture.

== Production method ==
In Korea, unlike the pottery of The Three Kingdoms period, combed pottery was made by hand, rather than using a pottery wheel, and used various molding methods, rotating methods, etc., mainly using the rolling method of stacking circular clay belts.

The pottery is generally fired in an open-air kiln without any special structure. However, kilns with certain structures have been found at the Podae site in Pyongyang, Jinjori site in Gimcheon, and Pyeongmi-dong site in Jinju, suggesting that more advanced kiln facilities were used since the middle Neolithic Age. Comb pottery is fired at a temperature of about 600-700 °C in an oxidized salt state, which gives most pottery a reddish brown or brown color.

== Cultures ==
- Xinglongwa culture (Northeast China)
- Jeulmun pottery period (Korea)
- Pit–Comb Ware culture (Finland, Baltic, and Russia)

== See also ==
- Jōmon pottery (Japan)
- Pottery of ancient Cyprus
