= Clerides (surname) =

Clerides (Greek: Κληρίδης) is a Greek surname. Notable people with the surname include:

- Costas Clerides (born 1952), Cypriot lawyer and former Attorney General of Cyprus
- Glafcos Clerides (1919–2013), Cypriot statesman, two-time president of Cyprus
- Ioannis Clerides (1887–1961), Greek Cypriot lawyer and politician
- Katherine Clerides (1949–2025), Cypriot politician
- Lila Irene Clerides (1921–2007), First Lady of Cyprus, wife of Glafcos
- Petros Clerides (born 1946), Cypriot lawyer and former Attorney General of Cyprus

== See also ==
- Cleridae, a family of beetles of the superfamily Cleroidea
