= Committee of the Cyprus Museum =

The Committee of the Cyprus Museum was established in 1882, it acted as a governing body for the newly established Cyprus Museum. It has been succeeded by the Department of Antiquities, Cyprus.

== History ==
The workings of the Committee were regulated by the Antiquities Law of 1905. According to the Law of 1905, the members of the Committee were to be elected by the private donors that funded the Committee. The Committee was abolished by the creation of the Department of Antiquities in 1934. Its funding came from the government and private donors, the government gave grants for excavations across the island.

The Committee was tasked with conducting excavations throughout the island and organising the collections of the Cyprus Museum. Additionally it granted a scholarship to Menelaos Markides to study archaeology at Oxford. In 1913 the Committee gained a government grand to conduct excavations in Lapithos, under archaeologists, John Linton Myres, Menelaos Markides and Leonard H. D. Buxton.

=== Members ===
The Committee was headed by the British High Commissioner. Its founding members were John Linton Myres, Claude Delaval Cobham. Ex oficio member was the archbishop of Cyprus. Other members included prominent scholars of Cypriot studies including Simos Menardos, Loukis Z. Pierides, Eustathios Konstantinides and his brother Pascal (Paschalis) Constantinides.

== See also ==
- Department of Antiquities, Cyprus
