= Attorney General Clerides =

Attorney General Clerides may refer to:

- Costas Clerides (born 1952), Attorney General of Cyprus
- Petros Clerides (born 1946), Attorney General of Cyprus
