= Pavlos Xioutas =

Pavlos Xioutas (Greek: Παύλος Ξιούτας) (Kato Paphos, 1908 - Limassol, 2 July 1991) was a Cypriot educator, poet and folklorist.

== Early life and education ==
Xioutas was born in Kato Paphos in 1908. He graduated first from the Limassol Primary school, and then attended the Limassol Gymnasium (now Laniteio Lyceum). Then, he left for Athens with his brother Nikolaos Xioutas, where he studied philology at the University of Athens, graduating in 1930.

== Career ==
After returning from his studies in Athens, Xioutas, worked as a schoolteacher and principal, in middle schools, especially in the rural areas, including at the Pancyprian Gymnasium between 1933 and 1937, as well as, schools in the villages of Omodos, Platres, Gialousa, and in the cities of Nicosia, Kyrenia, Morphou and others.

As a writer Xioutas published the newspaper Νέος Κόσμος (New World) between 1948 and 1950, and at the same time, the magazine, Σύγχρονη Σκέψη (Modern Thought) that included essays mostly on social and political matters, translated from English into Greek.

Xioutas was one of the most prominent folklorists of the 20th century Cyprus, his most important work is the three volume, Παροιμίες του Κυπριακού λαού (Proverbs of the Cypriot people), which was published between 1984 and 1985.

== Personal life ==
He has a daughter Nelly Papasavva, who has inherited the archive of her father.

== Legacy ==
In 1983 the Academy of Athens presented him with an award for his book titled Κυπριακή Λαογραφία των Ζώων (Cypriot Folklore of Animals). A bust of Xioutas was unveiled on 28 June 1994 at the Pavlos Xioutas park in Engomi. In 2015 he was commemorated by a stamp from the Cyprus post.

== Publications ==
- Ξιούτας, Π. (1937). Ξέναι λέξεις στην γλώσσα μας. Κυπριακαί Σπουδαί, Α’, 133–174.
- Ξιούτας, Π. (1938). Από τα τραγούδια μας.
- Ξιούτας, Π. (1978). Κυπριακή Λαογραφία των Ζώων. Λευκωσία: Κέντρο Επιστημονικών Ερευνών Κύπρου.
- Ξιούτας, Π. (1981). Ο Μάντζιπας. Κυπριακαί Σπουδαί, ΜΕ’, 175–199.
- Ξιούτας, Π. (1984). Παροιμίες του Κυπριακού λαού. Τόμος Α΄. Λευκωσία: Ίδρυμα Αρχιεπισκόπου Μακαρίου Γ.
- Ξιούτας, Π. (1985). Παροιμίες του Κυπριακού λαού. Τόμος Β΄. Λευκωσία: Ίδρυμα Αρχιεπισκόπου Μακαρίου Γ.
- Ξιούτας, Π. (1985). Παροιμίες του Κυπριακού λαού. Τόμος Γ΄. Λευκωσία: Ίδρυμα Αρχιεπισκόπου Μακαρίου Γ.
- Ξιούτας, Π. (2004). Ποιήματα. επιμ. Παντελής Βουτουρής. Λευκωσία: Πολιτιστικό Ίδρυμα Τραπέζης Κύπρου.
- Ξιούτας, Π. (2008). Ποιητικά άπαντα.

== See also ==
- Simos Menardos
- Kypros Chrysanthis
- Konstantinos Spyridakis
- Ioannis Sykoutris
