= Lala Mustafa Pasha Mosque =

Building in Famagusta, Cyprus

Cathedral of Saint Nicholas (1328–1571) Lala Mustafa Pasha Mosque (1571–present)
- Lala Mustafa Paşa Camii
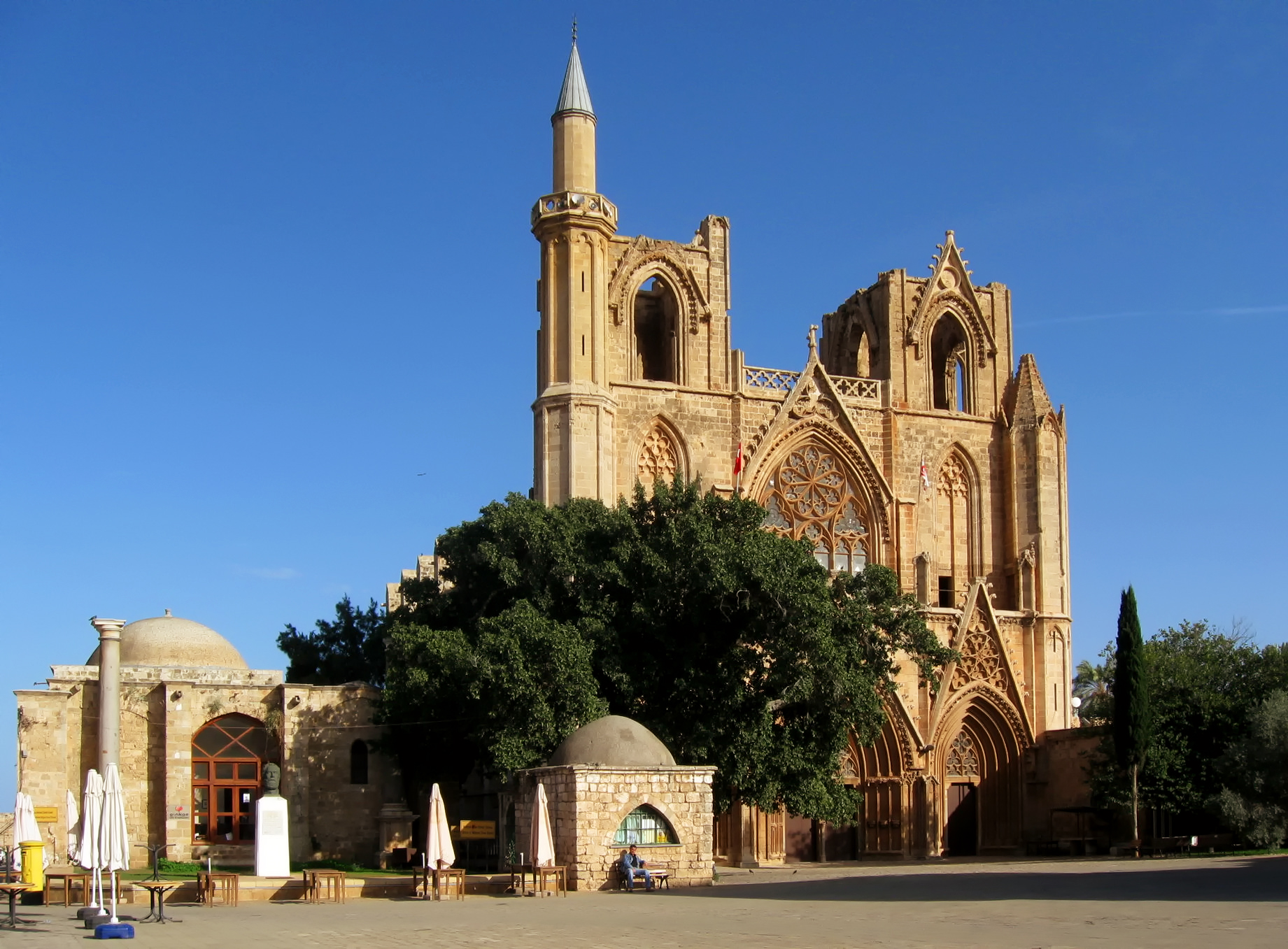

- The location of Saint Sophia Cathedral in Cyprus

Religion
- Affiliation: Catholic cathedral 1328–1571; Mosque 1571–present
- District: de jure Famagusta District de facto Gazimağusa District
- Year consecrated: 1328
- Status: Active as a mosque

Location
- Location: Famagusta de jure Cyprus de facto Northern Cyprus
- Coordinates: 35°07′30″N 33°56′34″E

Architecture
- Style: Gothic
- Groundbreaking: 1298
- Minaret: 1

The Lala Mustafa Pasha Mosque (Turkish: Lala Mustafa Paşa Camii), originally known as the Cathedral of Saint Nicholas and later as the Saint Sophia (Ayasofya) Mosque of Mağusa, is the largest medieval building in Famagusta, Cyprus.

Built between 1298 and c. 1400, it was consecrated as a Catholic cathedral in 1328. The cathedral was converted into a mosque after the Ottoman Empire captured Famagusta in 1571 and remains a mosque to this day. From 1954 the building has taken its name from Lala Mustafa Pasha, the grand vizier of the Ottoman Empire from Sokolovići in Bosnia, who served Murad III and led Ottoman forces against the Venetians in Cyprus.

== History ==
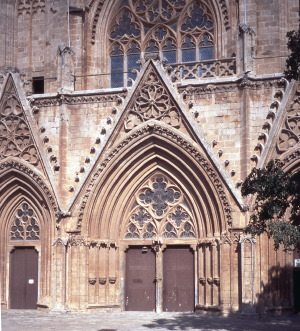
St. Nicholas Cathedral, Famagusta, west door, probably completed by 1311. The pierced Gothic-style balustrade above the gable is a restoration of George H. Everett Jeffery.

=== Early history ===
The French Lusignan dynasty ruled as kings of Cyprus from 1192 to 1489 and brought with them the latest French taste in architecture, notably developments in Gothic architecture.

The cathedral was constructed from 1298 to 1312 and was consecrated in 1328. An inscription on a buttress beside the south door records the progress of construction in 1311. "After an unfortunate episode when the current bishop embezzled the restoration fund", Bishop Guy of Ibelin bequeathed 20,000 bezants for its construction. The Lusignans were crowned as kings of Cyprus in the St. Sophia Cathedral (now Selimiye Mosque) in Nicosia and then crowned as kings of Jerusalem in the St Nicholas Cathedral in Famagusta.

The building is built in Rayonnant Gothic style, quite rare outside France. The historic tie between France and Cyprus is evidenced by its parallels to French archetypes such as Reims Cathedral. Indeed, so strong is the resemblance, that the building has been dubbed "The Reims of Cyprus"; it was built with three doors, twin towers over the aisles and a flat roof, typical of Crusader architecture.

Sometime after 1480, a meeting chamber, known as the Loggia Bembo, was added to the south-west corner of the cathedral. Notable for its elaborately moulded entrance with slender pillars in marble, it is in an architectural style that departs considerably from that of the cathedral proper. The association with the Bembo family, some of whom held prominent positions in Cyprus, is shown by their heraldic devices on the building. To enhance the Loggia, late antique fragments in marble, probably brought from Salamis, were placed as seats on each side of the entrance.

=== Ottoman era ===
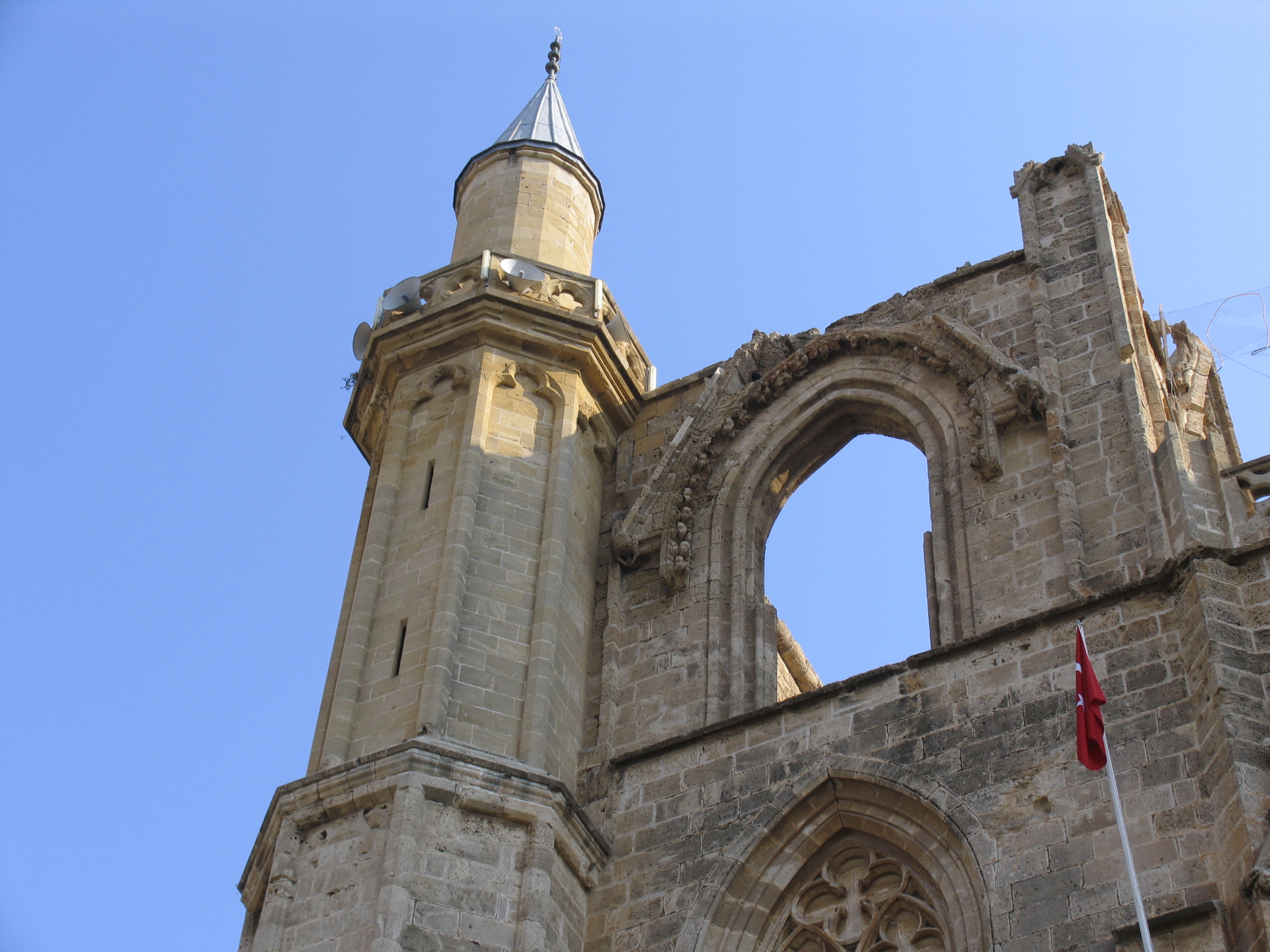
St. Nicholas Cathedral, Famagusta, the minaret. The Gothic-style facing of the minaret is a restoration of George H. Everett Jeffery.

The upper parts of the cathedral's two towers suffered from earthquakes, were badly damaged during the Ottoman bombardments of 1571, and were never repaired. With the Venetians defeated and Famagusta captured by August 1571, Cyprus came under Ottoman control and the cathedral was converted into a mosque, renamed the "St. Sophia Mosque of Mağusa".

Nearly all statuary, cruciforms, stained glass, frescos, and paintings were removed or plastered over, as well as most tombs and the altar. The Gothic structure was preserved however, and a few tombs can still be identified in the north aisle.

In 1954, it was renamed the Lala Mustafa Pasha Mosque after the commander of the 1570 Ottoman conquest.

== Architectural legacy ==
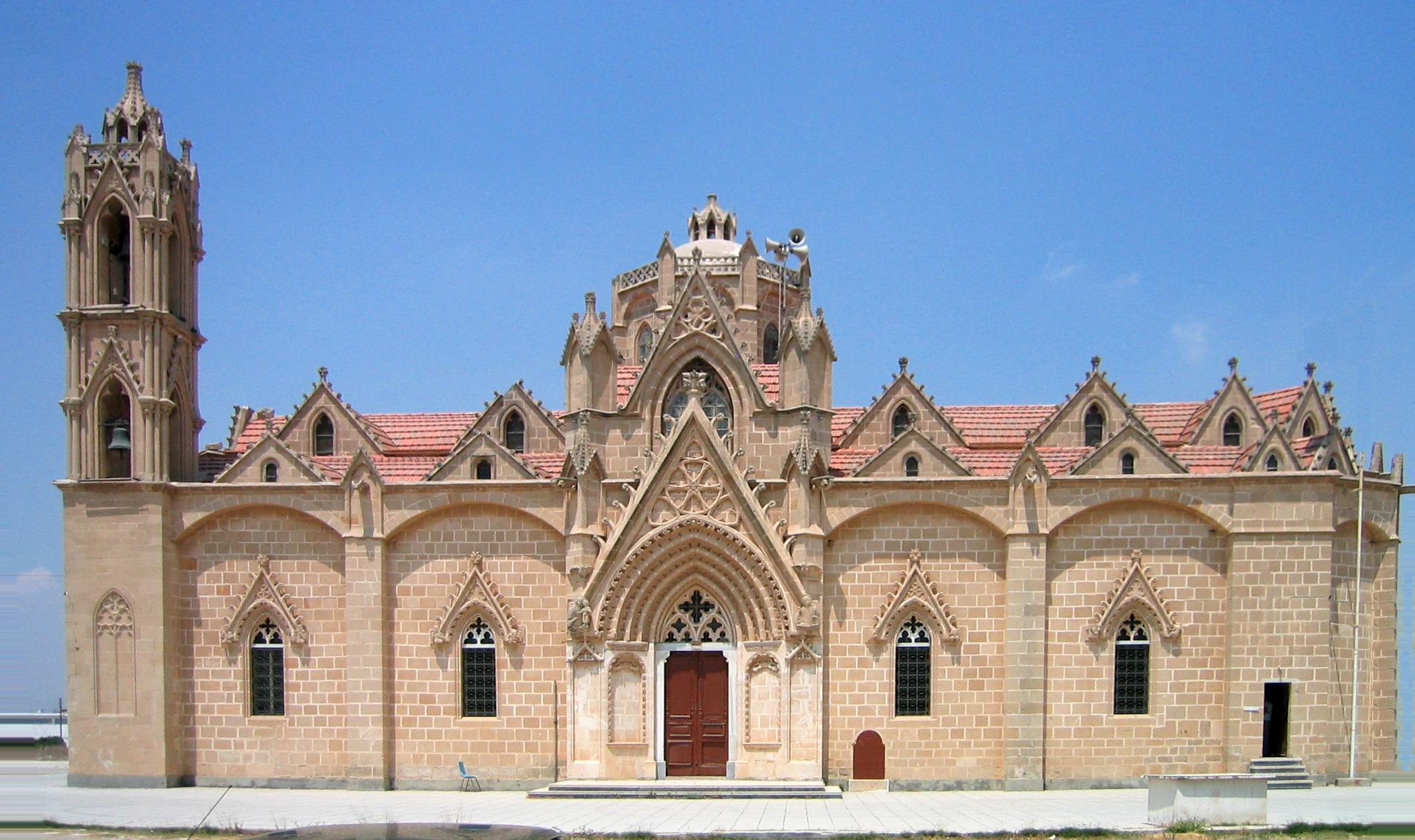
Panagia Lysis, Lysi, Famagusta district, Cyprus

The Cathedral of St. Nicholas was not widely emulated as far as can be judged from surviving buildings of the Lusignan period in Cyprus. However, in the nineteenth century the west portal and other details were copied directly in the Greek Orthodox church at Lysi.

== Famagusta Cathedral in literature ==
Famagusta Cathedral appears in several works of literature, including Kuraj by the Italian writer Silvia Di Natale, Sunrise by the British author Victoria Hislop and In Search of Sixpence by the Anglo-Cypriot author Michael Paraskos.

== See also ==
- Rayonnant
- Saint Sophia Cathedral, Nicosia
- Conversion of non-Muslim places of worship into mosques

== Gallery ==
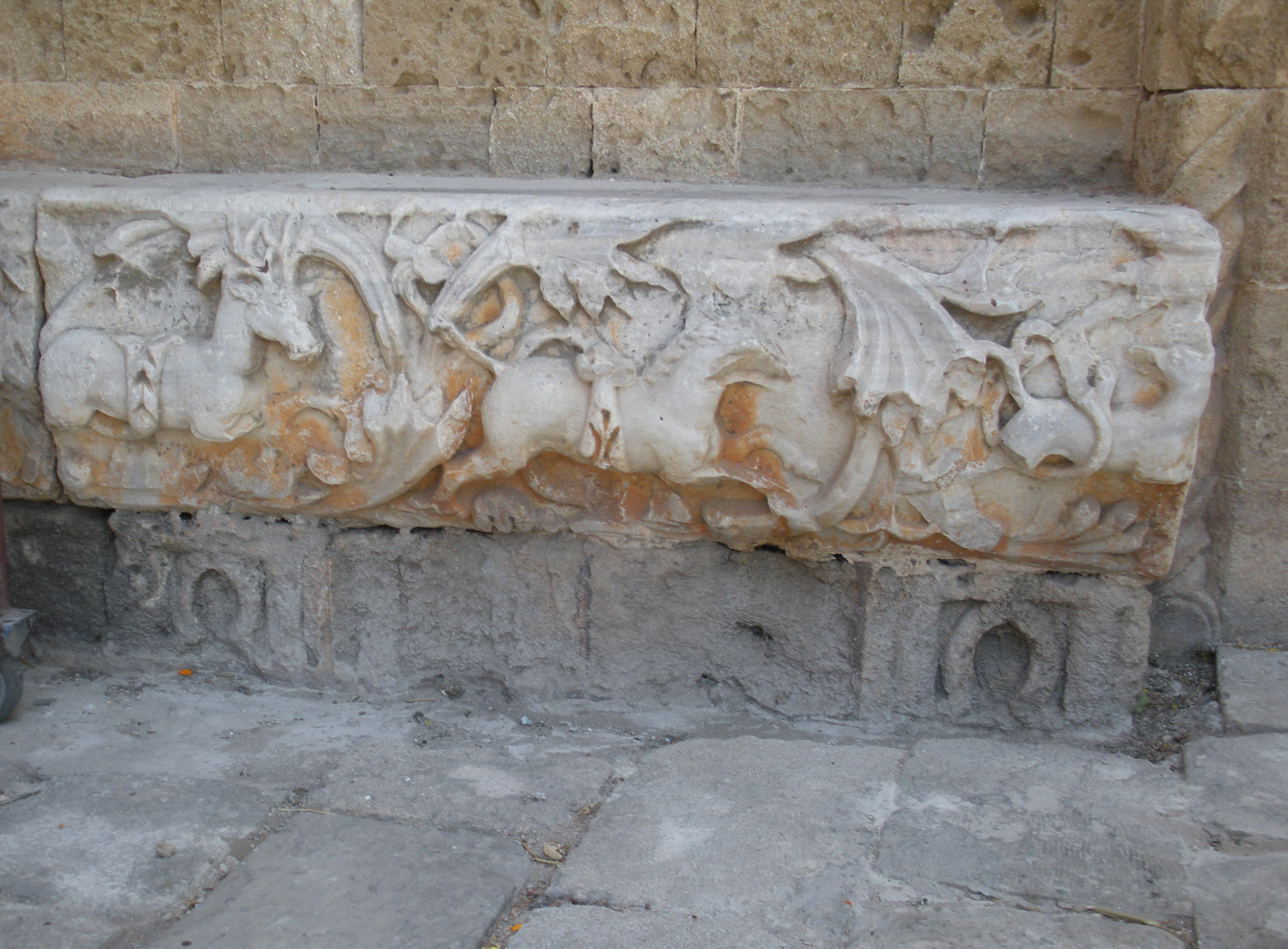
St. Nicholas Cathedral, Famagusta, Cyprus, detail of a late antique lintel used as a seat in front of Loggia Bembo.

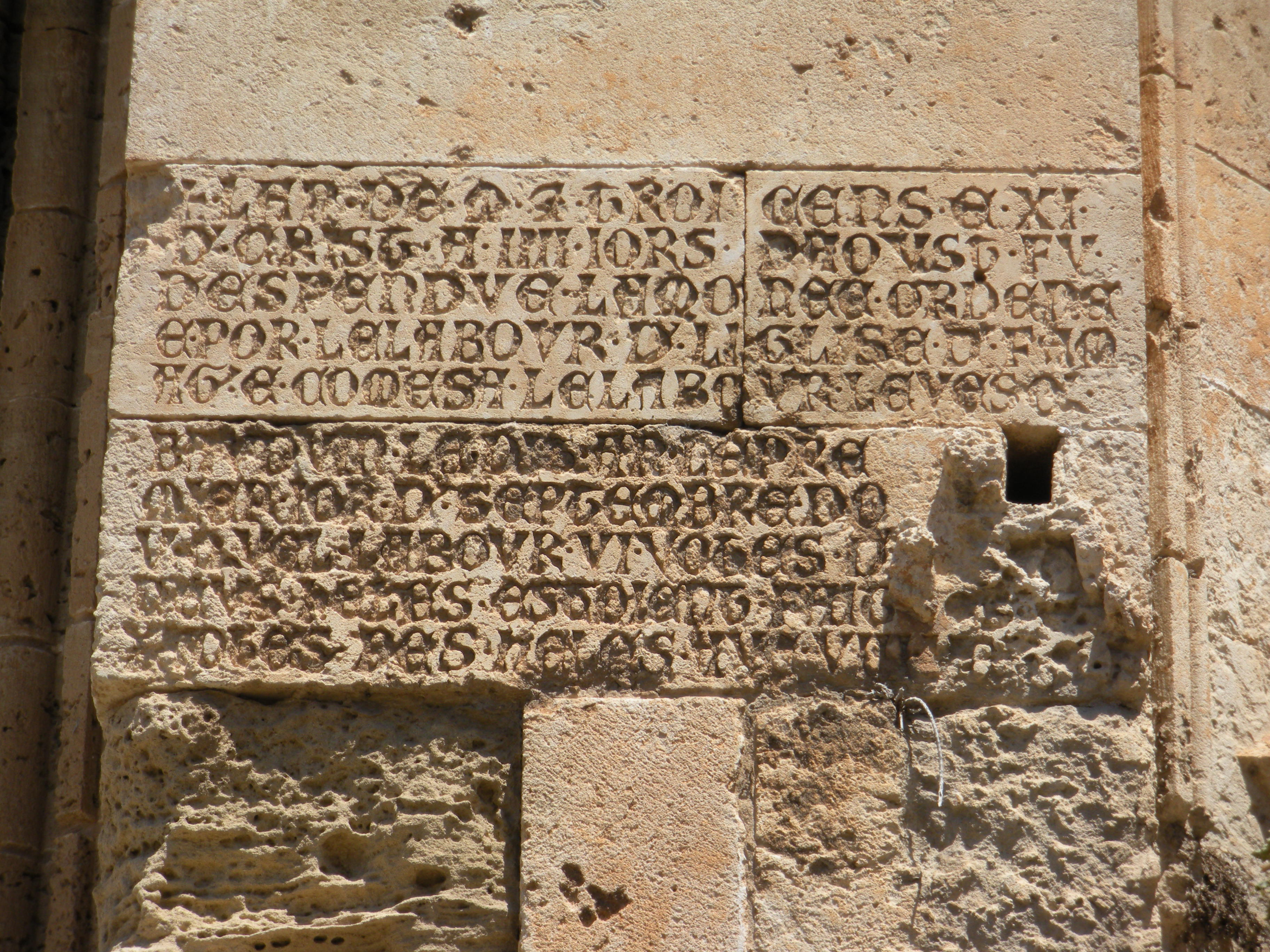
Inscription dated 1311 on the south side of St. Nicholas Cathedral, Famagusta, recording the progress of the construction.

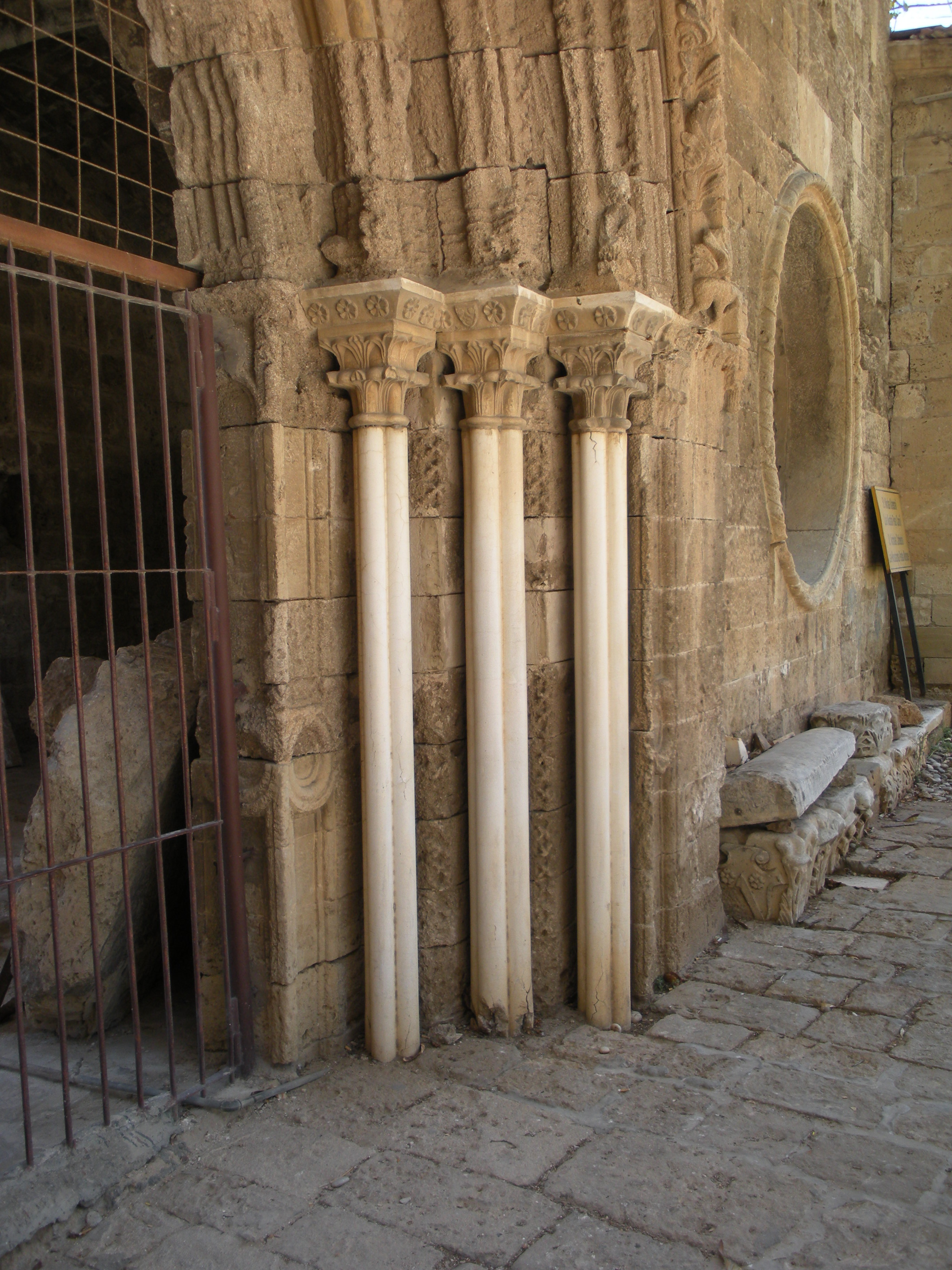
St. Nicholas Cathedral, Famagusta, Cyprus, Loggia Bembo, detail of the entrance, circa 1480s. The heraldic devices of the Bembo family are on the abaci of the pillars and visible on the end of the marble seat.

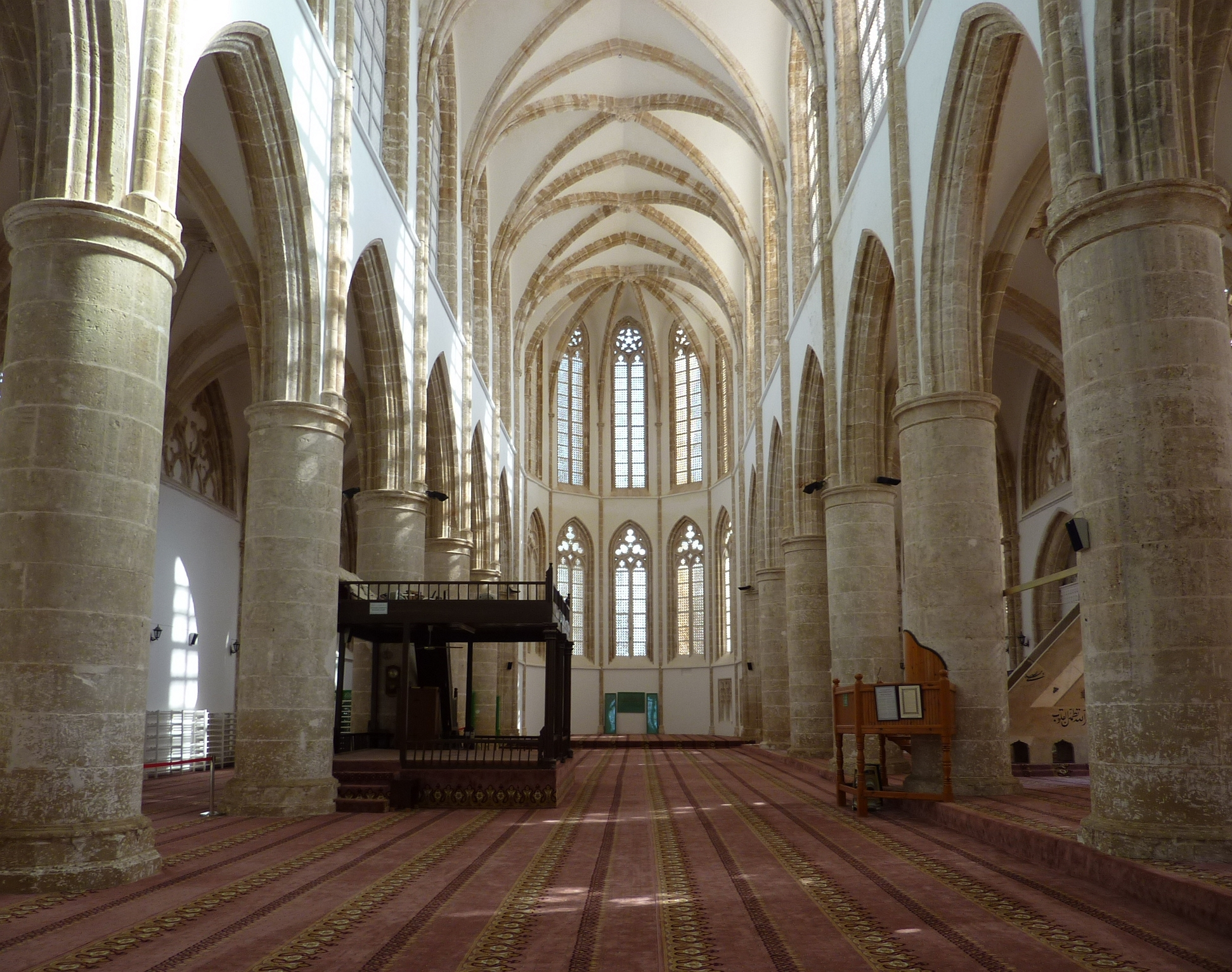
The interior.
