= Eustathios Konstantinides =

Eustathios Konstantinides (Greek: Ευστάθιος Κωνσταντινίδης) (1833 or 1842, Nicosia - 1913) was a Cypriot amateur archaeologist, philologist, school teacher and politician.

== Education and academic career ==
Konstantinides studied philology abroad and returned to Cyprus in 1880. In 1883 he became the director of all the schools in Nicosia. From 1893 to 1909 he was a professor of philology at the Pancyprian Gymnasium. From 1909 until 1913 he taught classes on archaeology. Additionally, he was president of "Kypriakos Sillogos" (Association of Cypriots), he became a member of the Committee of the Cyprus Museum at its inception in 1882 and he acted as Curator of Antiquities from 1889 to 1912. He conducted excavations at Idalion in 1908 and at a Bronze Age cemetery in Kythrea in 1909. He donated a small collection of Late Bronze Age cylinder seals to the Cyprus Museum.

== Political career ==
After his return to Cyprus in 1880 he was also involved in politics, in 1883 he run for parliament in the district of Nicosia in the first parliamentarian elections that took place in Cyprus and became part of the first Legislative Council that was established by the British. He served until 1891.

== Personal life ==
His brother Pascal (Paschalis) Constantinides (1840-1937) was a member of the Committee of the Cyprus Museum and a member of the Legislative Council.

== Publications ==
- Konstantinides, E. (13 October 1888). Helmets. The Owl. Science, Literature and Art, 4, 29-32.
- Konstantinides E. (1889) Ecclesiastical Studies in Cyprus, A New Bishop from Carpasia, The Owl. Science, Literature and Art.
- Konstantinides, E. (April 1889). ᾽Ι(ν) τύχαι ἀζαταῖ. The Journal of Cypriote Studies, 23-24.
- Konstantinides, E. (1907) Kypros. Memnon, Zeitschrift für die Kunst- und Kultur-Geschichte des Alten Orients, 1, 245-246.

== See also ==
- Menelaos Markides
