= Katydata =

Katydata: Κατύδατα (Greek); Katidata (Turkish)
- Village
- Location in Cyprus
- Coordinates: 35°4′57″N 32°53′17″E
- Country: Cyprus
- District: Nicosia District

Government
  - Community leader (Mukhtar): Andreas Eleftheriou
- Elevation: 902 ft (275 m)

Population (2021)
  - Total: 109
- Time zone: UTC+2 (EET)
  - Summer (DST): UTC+3 (EEST)
- Postal code: 2835

Katydata (Greek: Κατύδατα; Turkish: Katidata) is a village in the Nicosia District of Cyprus, located 56 kilometres from Nicosia and 2 kilometres north of Linou. It is in the Solea Valley.

== History ==
Archaeologist Menelaos Markides has excavated in Katydata (as well as the surrounding area), and this yielded 100 ancient tombs as well as many amphorae from the Bronze Age.

Furthermore, the Troodos Archaeological and Environmental Survey Project (TAESP), carried out to examine the relationship between people and their environment from the Neolithic to the Modern period, surveyed a total of 159 square kilometres which included Katydata.

One area (Laonarka) surveyed in the village in 2002 as a part of the TAESP yielded some red polished ware along with some bone (possibly human), as well as major pottery scatter from the Late Bronze Age. This almost certainly originated from tombs.

The research team discovered that another area (Pano Limna) included an Archaic sanctuary and a substantial Late Roman settlement. According to the findings, there was a wider chronology of occupation than expected, with a wide range of Iron Age material, but also material from the Hellenistic and Early Roman periods, as well as the expected Late Roman. Figurines, terracotta sculptures and statues were unearthed. The research team speculated that the significant numbers of figurines and rather sparse contemporary sherds could mean that they originated from a bothros from the sanctuary.

=== Demographics ===
Historical census data recorded by the Statistical Service of Cyprus shows that Katydata's population peaked in the mid-20th century before experiencing a steady decline due to rural urbanisation:

- 1881: 123 (63 males, 60 females)
- 1946: 372
- 1960: 366
- 2011: 114
- 2021: 100

== Geography ==
Two rivers flow through the village: the Karkotis and the Setrachos. In fact, the name of the village literally means "low" (Greek: κάτω) and "water(s)" (Greek: ύδωρ). It also lies next to the only active mine in Cyprus, which produces copper cathodes.

A natural water source that has been converted to a type of fountain lies west of the old village centre and east of the Karkotis. This is called Paliovrysi (Greek: Παλιόβρυση).

== Culture ==
There is a Museum of Mining Heritage, which is located in the village centre. It consists of two rooms: one is designed to look like a mine and contains various mining articles; the other room has displays of the minerals from the nearby mine. There is also a communal park, which offers a vantage point.

The village hosts a yearly music festival called Windcraft Music Fest, which is organised by the non-profit cultural association Windcraft Loud. There is a particular emphasis on wind instruments.

== Religion ==
The inhabitants' religion is mostly Greek Orthodox. The main village church is dedicated to Agios Ioannis Theologos and was built in 1870 over the ruins of an older church. There is a smaller church called Agia Paraskevi (Greek: Αγία Παρασκευή) and, in the outskirts of the village, in nearby Skouriotissa, there is also the Monastery of Panagia Skouriotissa.

== Education ==
Katydata used to have a primary school but this has been closed for years. Children can attend nursery school (Greek: νηπιαγωγείο), gymnasium (Greek: γυμνάσιο) and lyceum (Greek: λύκειο) in Evrychou.
