= Pancyprian Gymnasium =

Oldest High School in Cyprus

Coordinates: 35°10′24″N 33°22′09″E

- Παγκύπριον Γυμνάσιον
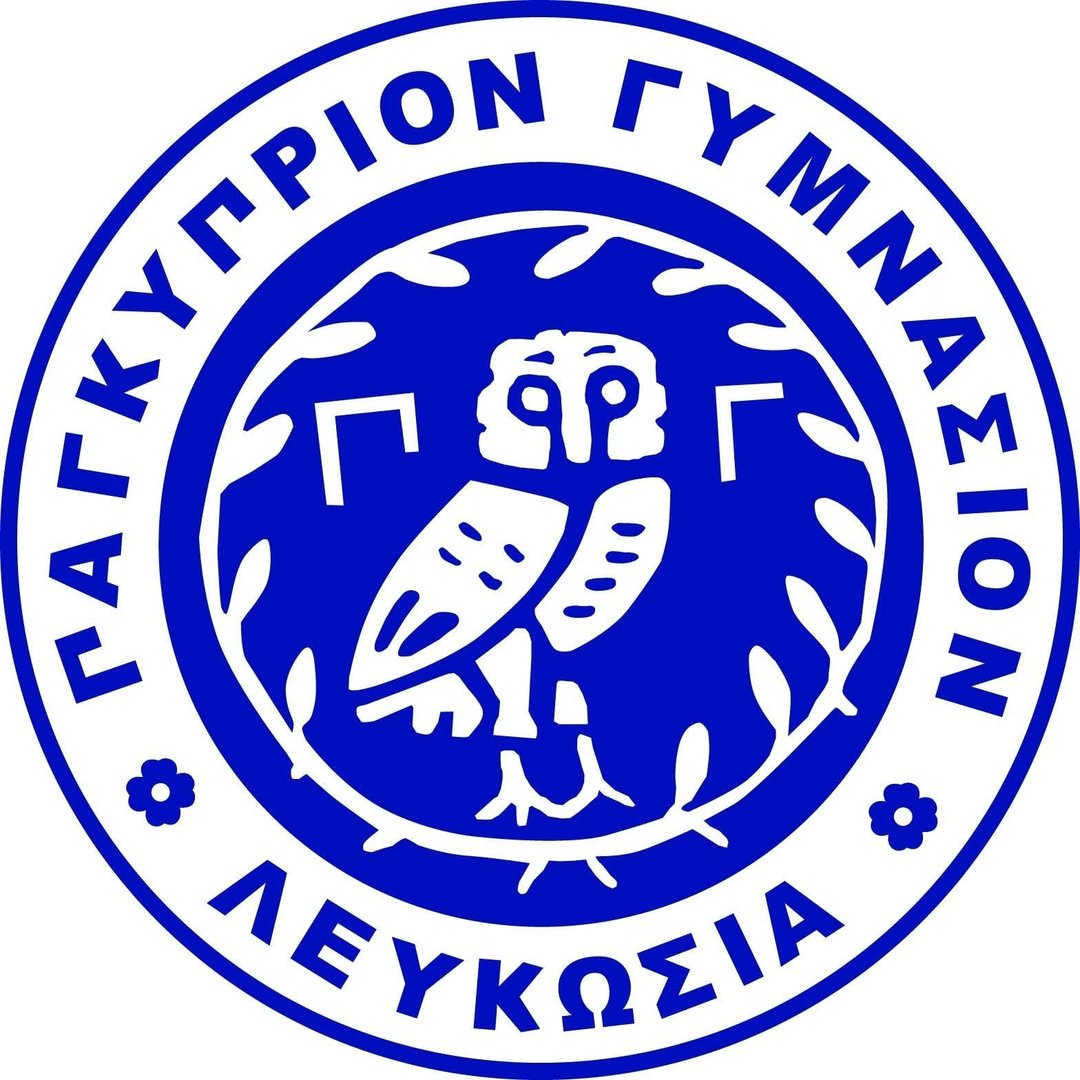

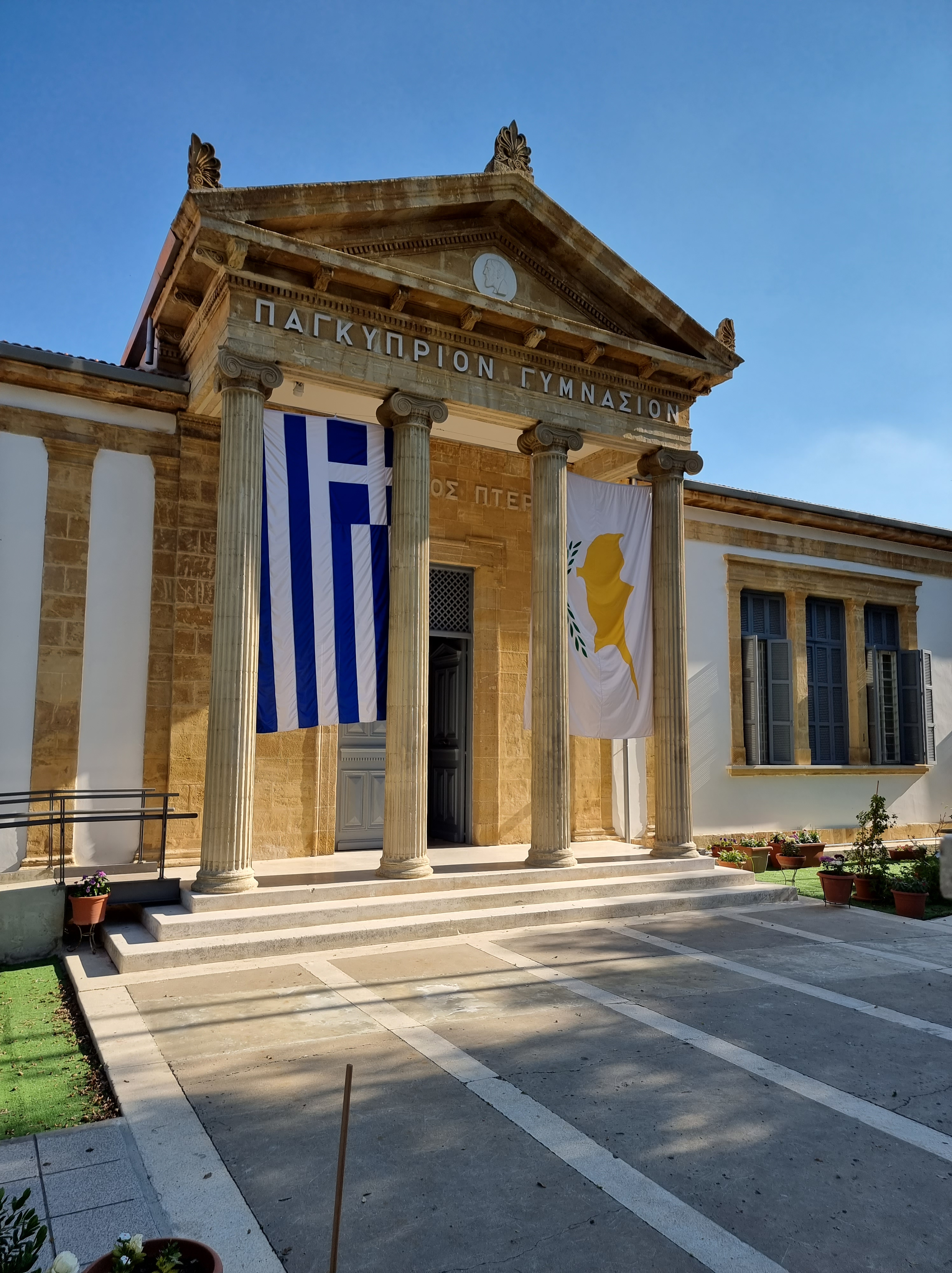
- Main entrance view
- Nicosia, Cyprus

Information
- Type: Public High-School
- Religious affiliations: High influence by the Church of Cyprus when it comes to funding & decision-making
- Established: 1812; 214 years ago
- Founder: Archbishop Kyprianos
- School district: Nicosia
- Principal: Maria Stavridou Morphi
- Enrollment: 783 students (2025-2026)
- Capacity: unknown
- Language: Greek, English, French
- Colors: Blue and white
- Publication: ΠαγκύπριΟΝ ΕΑΡ (Radio Station)
- Newspaper: Το Νήμα (Newspaper), Μαθητική Εστία (Magazine)
- Tuition: State School, Free
- Website: lyk-pagkyprion-lef.schools.ac.cy
- Last updated: 27/4/2026

The Pancyprian Gymnasium (Greek: Παγκύπριον Γυμνάσιον, romanized: Pankýprion Gymnásion) is the oldest still operational high school in Cyprus, founded in 1812.

== History ==
In the location of the current school, an older school existed, established in 1753, known as Ellinomouseion (Greek: Ελληνιμουσείον).

The Pancyprian Gymnasium was founded in 1812, by Archbishop Kyprianos, at a time when Cyprus was still under Ottoman rule. It was originally called the Hellenic School of Nicosia (Greek: Ελληνική Σχολή Λευκωσίας) and is the oldest high school in operation on the island. The first principal of the Gymnasium in 1893, was Delios Ioannis. The school was expanded in 1893, by the initiative of Archbishop Sophronius III, to incorporate a lyceum when Cyprus was under British rule, therefore making it equal to Greek high schools, deeming its students eligible to study at the University of Athens.

In 1894, aside from the secondary school, a school for primary school teachers was founded, the Didaskaleio (Greek: Διδασκάλειο). In 1896 it changed its name to its current one.

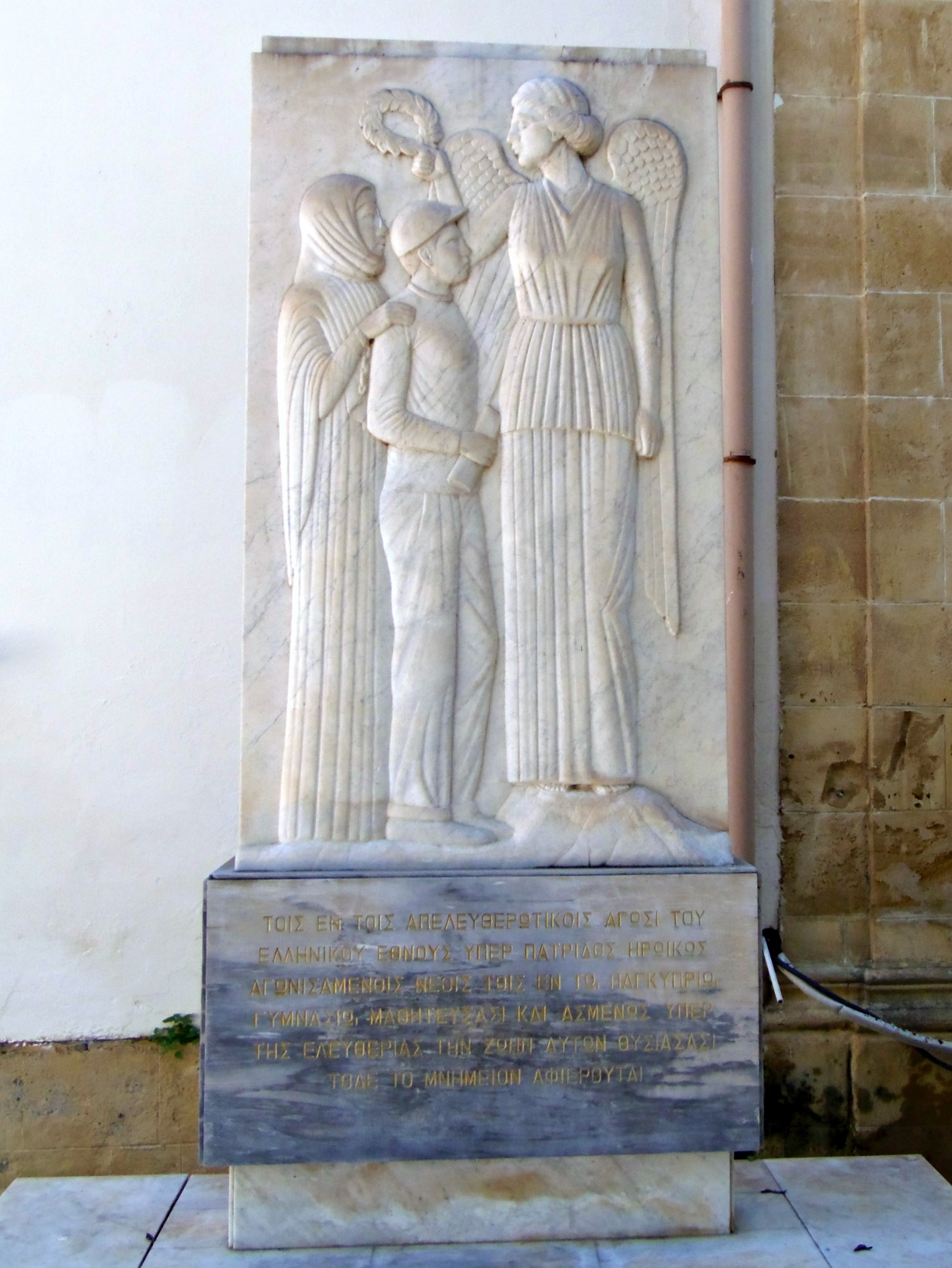
Honorary statue to the students-warrior of the Gymnasium in the Greek Independence War

Students of the school have fought in the Greek War of Independence, Greco-Turkish War of 1897, the Balkan Wars and participated in the EOKA struggle.

In tribute to the school's contribution to education the Cyprus Post office issued a commemorative stamp in 1993.

== Grounds ==
It is located opposite the archbishopric within the walls of the old city of Nicosia. The original building was destroyed in a fire in 1920, and parts of the school were completely rebuilt in neoclassical style. The gymnastics facilities are being renovated as of the 2025-2026 academic year.

Of particular historical interest is the crypt of the school located beneath the main entrance. This is where Archbishop Kyprianos was said to have held secret meetings with representatives of the Philiki Etairia in the early 19th century.

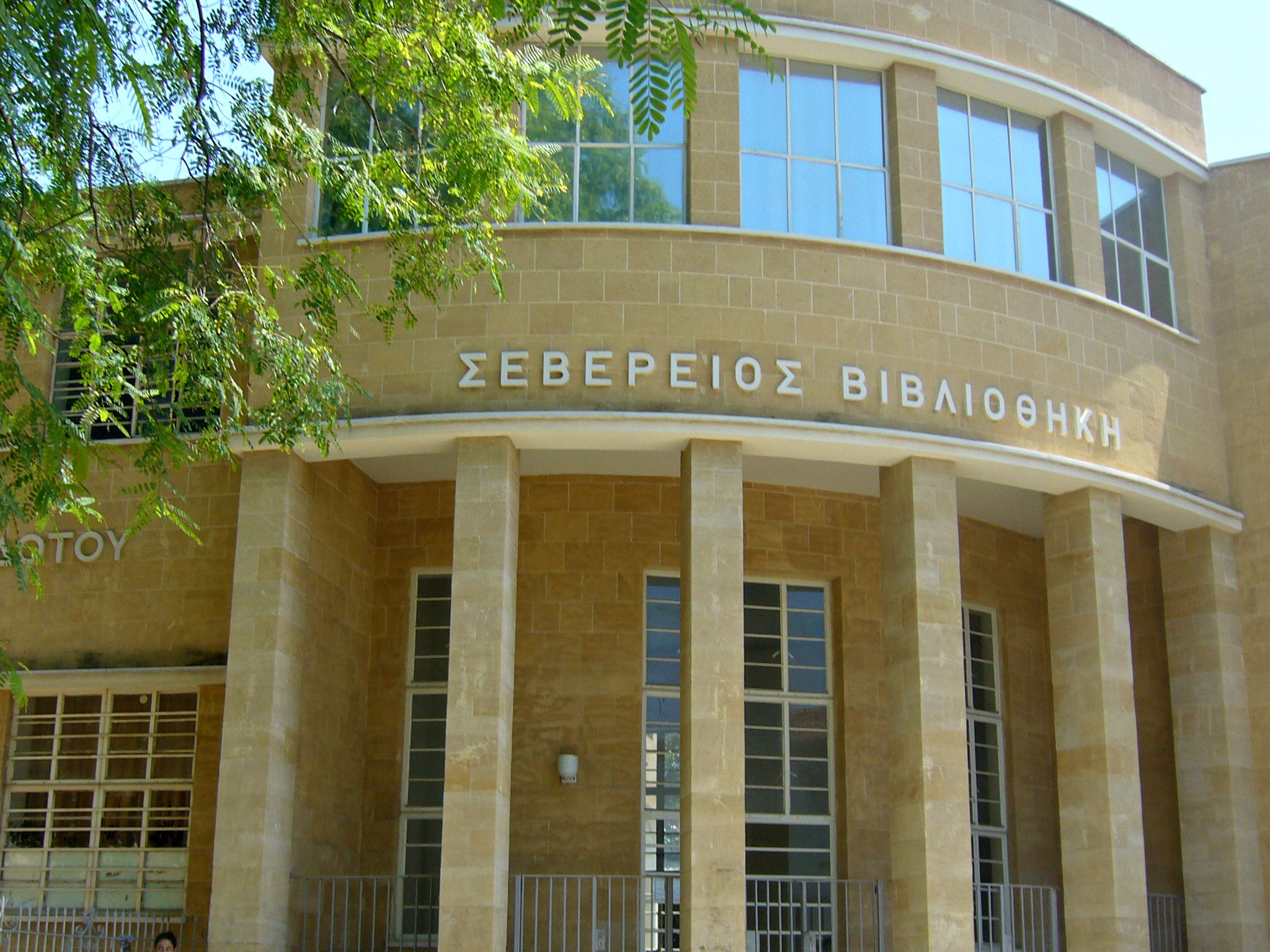
Entrance to the Severios Library

The school also incorporates a collection of artifacts, art and books. The Severios Library which opened in 1949 holds over 60,000 manuscripts.

== Notable alumni ==
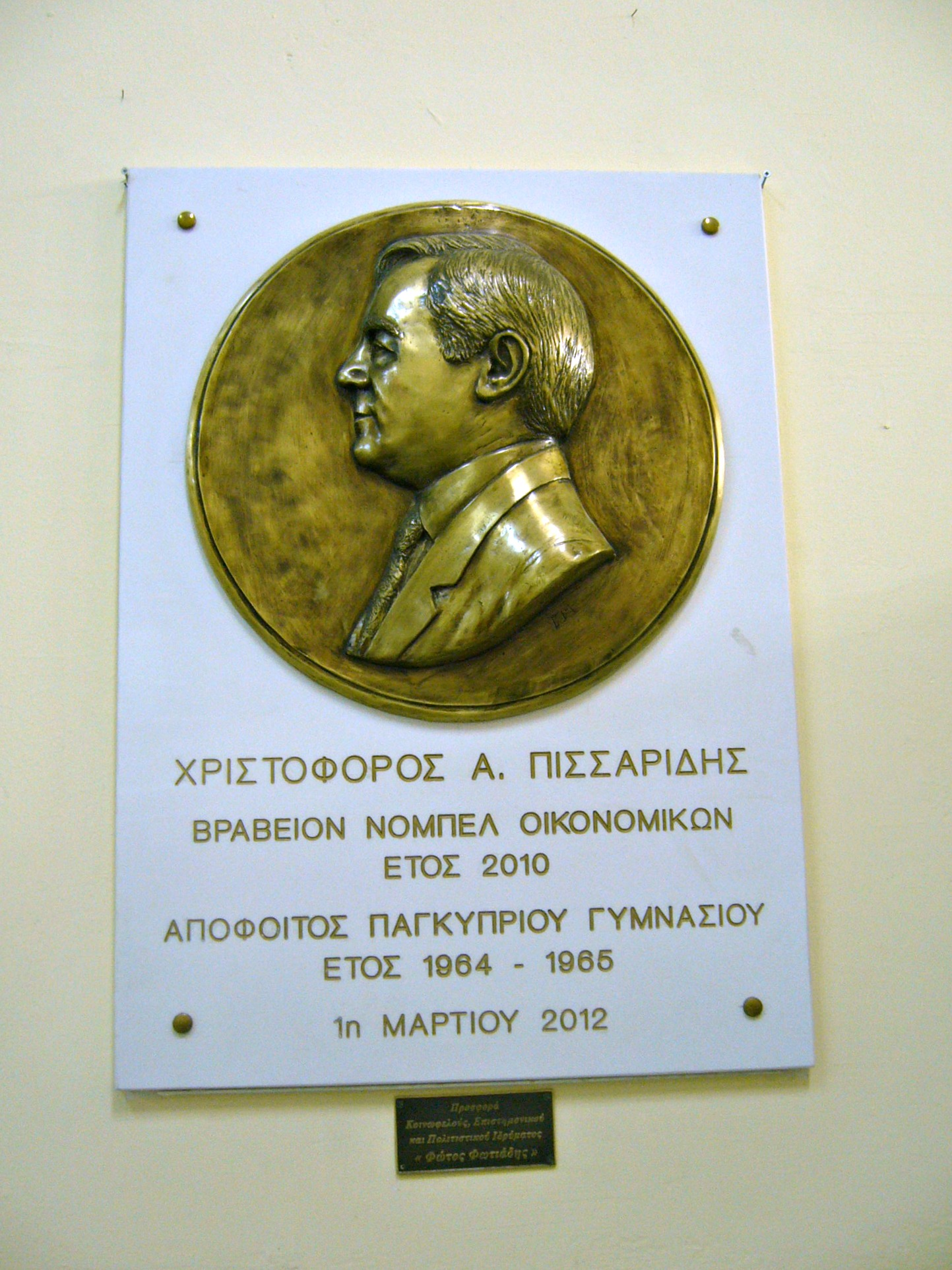
Honorary Plaque to the alumni, Christopher A. Pissarides

- Christopher A. Pissarides, Nobel Prize-winning economist
- Archbishop Makarios, Past President of Cyprus
- Glafkos Clerides, Past President of Cyprus
- Tassos Papadopoulos, Past President of Cyprus
- Georgios Grivas, Leader of the Cyprus Independence War
- Vassos Lyssarides, Politician and Leader of the Socialist Party
- Costas Clerides, former Attorney General of Cyprus
- Petros Clerides, former Attorney General of Cyprus
- Kypros Chrysanthis, Writer and Doctor
- Athanasios Papageorgiou, Byzantine archaeologist, Director of the Department of Antiquities
- Vassos Karageorghis, Director of the Department of Antiquities
- Costas Kadis, European Commissioner for Fisheries and Oceans

== Notable professors ==
- Lawrence Durrell, 1953 to 1956, English professor

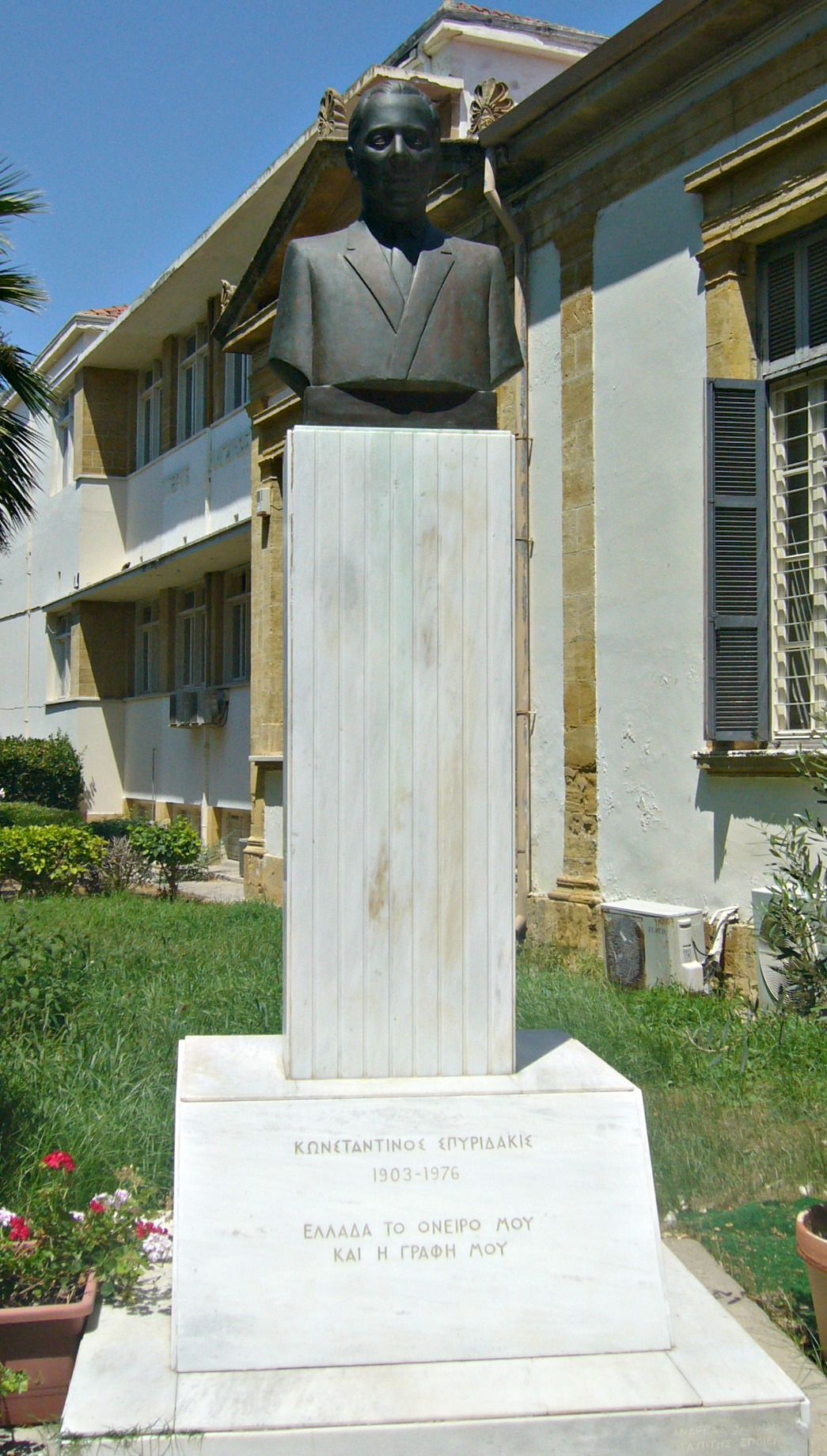
Honorary Statue to professor, Konstantinos Spyridakis

- Konstantinos Spyridakis, Professor, Writer, Minister of Education
- Chrysostomos I, 1961 to 1966, Theology Professor
- Dimitris Lipertis, 1910 to 1912, Poet, French teacher
- Menelaos, Markides, First Curator of the Cyprus Museum
- Kypros Chrysanthis, Writer and Doctor
- Adamantios Diamantis, Painter
- Telemachos Kanthos, Painter
- Eustathios Konstantinides, Philologist
- Pavlos Xioutas, Philologist

== See also ==
- Nicosia
- University of Athens
- University of Nicosia
- Cyprus
- [[Schools]]
