= Menelaos Markides =

Menelaos Markides (Greek: Μενέλαος Μαρκίδης) (1878, Nicosia - 1942) was a Cypriot archaeologist and the first curator of the Cyprus Museum (1912–1931).

== Early life and education ==
He was born in Nicosia in 1878 and graduated from the Pancyprian Didaskaleion, a two-year college for school teachers. Later he earned his PhD in philology from the University of Athens in 1899. In 1897 he volunteered during the Greco-Turkish war. After returning to Cyprus, he worked as a professor of history at the Pancyprian Gymnasium, as well as schools in Limassol, Port-Said, Athens and Caesarea.

== Archaeological career ==
In 1909 he was sent with a scholarship from the Committee of the Cyprus Museum to the University of Oxford, where he studied under John Myres, as well as in Germany to study Classical archaeology. Upon his return in 1911 he was appointed as the curator of the Cyprus Museum, a position he weld for two decades. Markides organised the Museum in a systematic basis.

In 1912 he invited his former tutor John Myres to excavate with him in Cyprus, they excavated together in Idalion. Between 1913 and 1917, Markides, along with John Myres and Leonard Halford Dudley Buxton conducted systematic excavations on behalf of the Cyprus Museum at the Early-Middle Bronze Age site Vrysi tou Barba in Lapithos. The excavations were among the first in Cyprus to follow scientific methods.

Additionally, Markides excavated at Arpera, Skouriotissa, Katydhata, and in 1917, he excavated an Iron Age sanctuary at Arsos which was later published by the Swedish Cyprus Expedition, more specifically A. Westholm, due to his ill health. In 1916 and 1918, he excavated 50 tombs at Marion. He also excavated at Enkomi and Golgoi. He studied and published Cypriot sculpture.

In 1931, he retired as curator of the Cyprus Museum and Porphyrios Dikaios succeeded him as curator.

== Publications ==
- Markides, M. (1910). My notes on Sites and Antiquities in Cyprus.
- Markides, M. (1912). A Mycenaean Bronze in the Cyprus Museum. The Annual of the British School at Athens, 18, 95–97.
- Markides, M. (1913). A Marble Head from Cyprus. The Journal of Hellenic Studies, 33, 48–49.
- Markides, M. (1916). Excavations at Skouriotissa and Katydhata. Annual Report of the Curator of Antiquities for 1915, 15.
- Markides, M. (1916). Rapport du conservateur des antiquités à Chypre pour l'année 1914. Revue Archéologique, 4,157-162.
- Markides, M. (1917). Excavations at Skouriotissa and Katydhata. Annual Report of the Curator of Antiquities for 1916, 4-20.

== See also ==
- Department of Antiquities, Cyprus
- Rupert Gunnis
- Hector Catling
