= Kyprianos of Cyprus =

Archbishop of Cyprus from 1810 to 1821

Kyprianos
- Archbishop of Cyprus
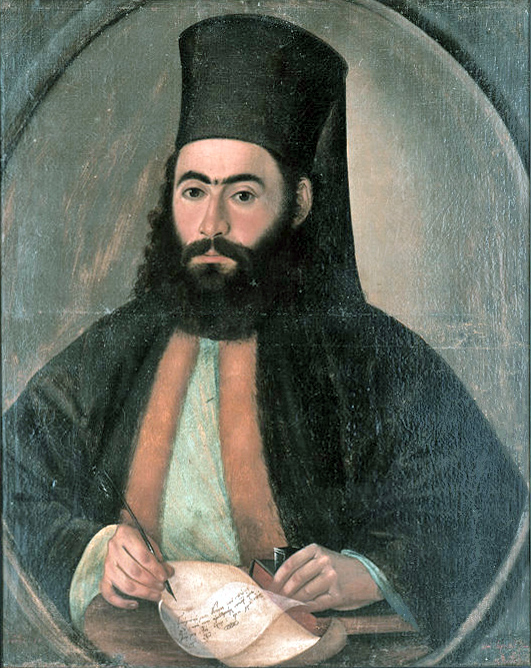
- Oil painting of Kyprianos
- Church: Orthodox
- Installed: 1810
- Term ended: 1821
- Predecessor: Chrysanthos
- Successor: Ioakim

Personal details
- Born: 1756 Strovolos
- Died: 1821 (aged 64–65) Nicosia

Archbishop Kyprianos of Cyprus (Greek: Κυπριανός) was the head of the Cypriot Orthodox Church in the early 19th century at the time that the Greek War of Independence broke out.

== Biography ==
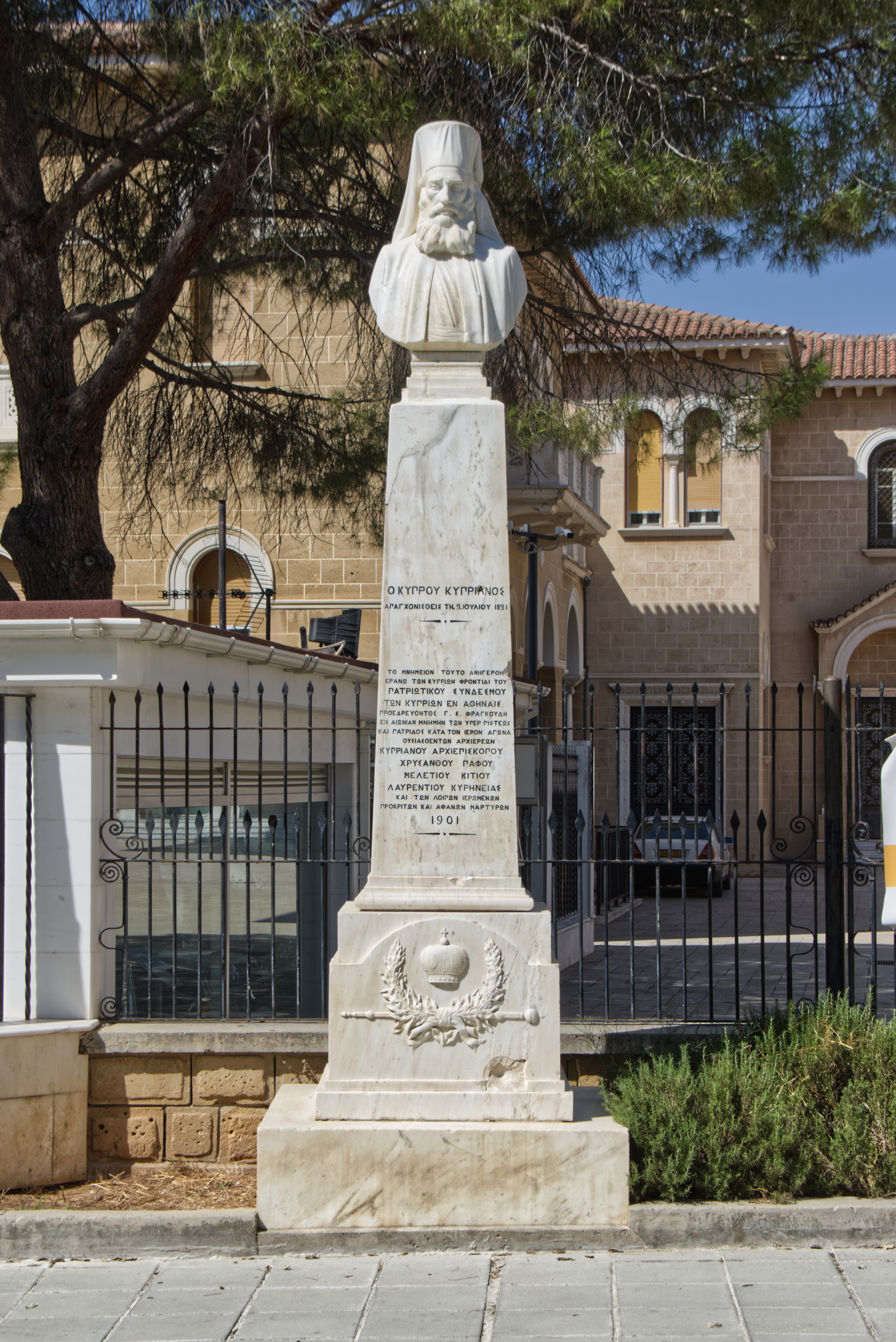
Bust of Kyprianos located in Nicosia

Kyprianos was born in (the then village of) Strovolos in 1756. He served as a monk in Machairas monastery until 1783 when he left for Wallachia for further theological studies returning to Cyprus in 1802. He became archbishop of Cyprus in 1810. He founded the Pancyprian Gymnasium (originally called the Hellenic School) in 1812 which was the first secondary school on the island and which is still located opposite the archbishopric in Nicosia.

In 1818, Kyprianos was initiated into the Friendly Society (Philiki Etairia) which was preparing the ground for war and liberation from the Ottoman Empire. In 1820, Alexander Ypsilantis contacted the archbishop asking for Cyprus to join in the armed struggle. Kyprianos' reply was pragmatic: He suggested that Cyprus support the upcoming revolution with money and supplies as any armed struggle was bound to end in disaster. Cyprus, being an isolated island far from Greece, had no substantial navy and no tradition of Klepht warfare like other parts of the Greek world.

However, when the Greek War of Independence broke out on 25 March 1821, Cypriots left in large numbers to fight in Greece, while proclamations were distributed in every corner of the island. The local pasha, Küçük Mehmet, reacted with fury, calling in reinforcements, confiscating weapons and arresting several prominent Cypriots. Archbishop Kyprianos was urged (by his friends) to leave the island as the situation worsened but refused to do so. Finally, on 9 July 1821 Küçük Mehmet had the gates to the walled city of Nicosia closed and executed, by beheading or hanging, 470 important Cypriots including Chrysanthos (bishop of Paphos), Meletios (bishop of Kition) and Lavrentios (bishop of Kyrenia). Archbishop Kyprianos was publicly hanged from a tree opposite the former palace of the Lusignan Kings of Cyprus. The events leading up to his execution were documented in an epic poem written in the Cypriot dialect by Vassilis Michaelides.

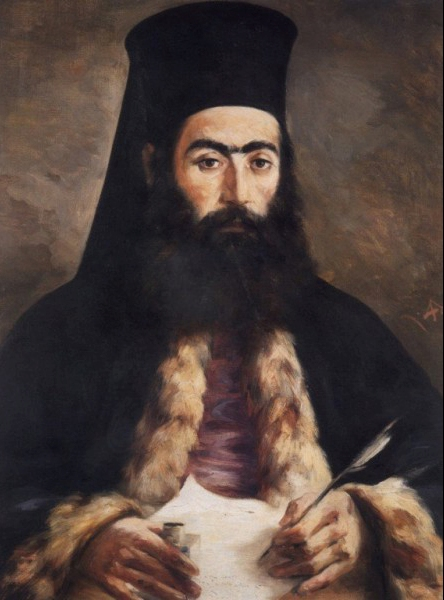
Painting of Kyprianos from the Athens War Museum

Kyprianos was outspoken on the issue of Freemasonry which he condemned.

Archbishop Kyprianos and the bishops Chrysanthos, Meletios and Lavrentios were buried in the crypt of the monument at the Faneromeni Church in Nicosia.

== See also ==
- New martyr
