= Eshmun obelisk =

Obelisk with Phoenician inscription

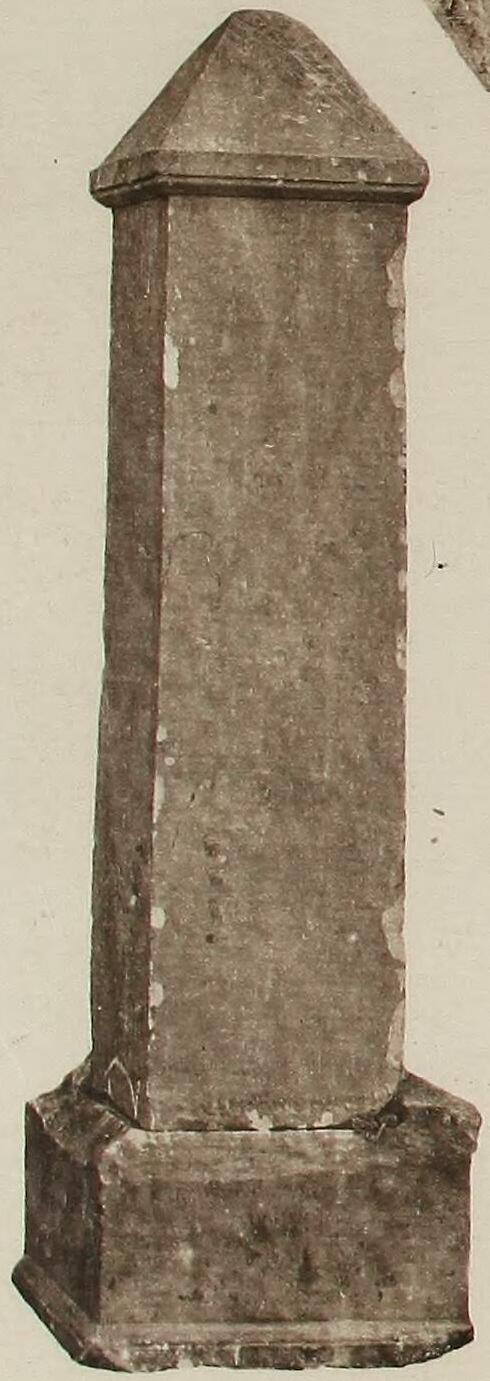
Corpus Inscriptionum Semiticarum CIS I 44

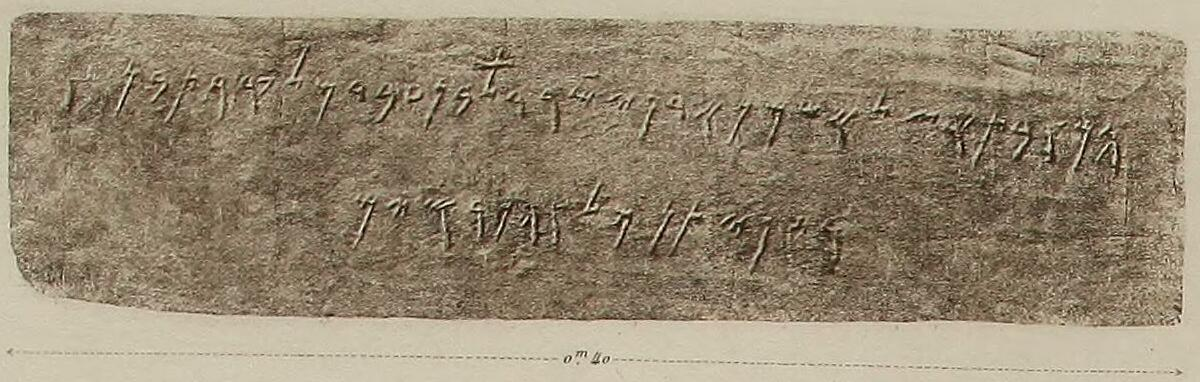
Corpus Inscriptionum Semiticarum CIS I 44 inscription only (cropped)

The Eshmun obelisk is an obelisk with a two-line Phoenician inscription found in Kition, Cyprus by Claude Delaval Cobham in 1881. It is known as CIS I 44, KI 21, NE 420,2 and NSI 15. It was used as a Baetylus, or devotional object.

Cobham was the District Commissioner of Larnaka, but also acted as an informal agent for the British Museum. The stele with was discovered during the construction of the highroad in the Tourabi Tekke area.
