= Claude Delaval Cobham =

Claude Delaval Cobham (30 June 1842-1915) was a British Colonial official in Cyprus from 1878 to 1908, from 1879 until 1907 he acted as the District Commissioner of Larnaca.

He studied Literae Humaniores at University College, Oxford from 1861 until 1865 and then did an M.A. in 1869. In July 1880 together with the High Commissioner Sir Robert Biddulph recommended to the Secretary of State for the Colonies Kimberley, the introduction of the English language to the primary schools of Cyprus at the expense of the Greek and Turkish languages of the two communities of the island. When this became known in Cyprus, it draw negative reactions from the locals and was rejected by Kimberley.

Outside of his official work, Cobham was an antiquarian and had participated in excavations with Max Ohnefalsh-Richter at Salamis and elsewhere. He donated some antiquities to the British Museum between the years 1880 and 1898, his personal collection of about 200 artefacts is currently in the Royal Albert Memorial Museum in Exeter. He was one of the founding members of the Committee of the Cyprus Museum established in 1882.

He is noted for his published works on Cypriot history, especially Excerpta Cypria, where he translated into English from 12 different languages excerpts pertaining Cyprus from various writers, starting from Strabo and ending with Gervinus. Additionally he published the book An Attempt at a Bibliography of Cyprus, with a compilation of bibliography that also included sections on numismatics, epigraphy, language, cartography, consular reports etc. Furthermore his book A Handbook of Cyprus with J. T. Hutchinson focused on the geological and geographical characteristics of the island, as well as agriculture, commerce, industry, irrigation works, forests, fisheries, harbours, finance, government and other information.

== Publications ==
- Cobham, C. D. & Ohnefalsch Richter, M. (1883). A Pre-Historic Building at Salamis. The Journal of Hellenic Studies, 4, 111–116.
- Cobham, C. D. (1897). The Story of Umm Ḥarám. The Journal of the Royal Asiatic Society of Great Britain and Ireland, 81–101.
- Cobham, C. D. (1889). Cypriot Words in ancient Greek. The Journal of Cyprian Studies, 19–23.
- Cobham, C. D. (1889). An Attempt at a Bibliography of Cyprus. Nicosia. 2nd Ed.
- Cobham, C. D. (1894). An Attempt at a Bibliography of Cyprus. Nicosia: Government Printing Office. 3rd Ed.
- Cobham, Claude Delaval. Umm Ḥarám. Pamphlets. printed by Stephen Austin and Sons, 1897.
- Graziani, Antonio Maria (1899). De Bello Cyprio. Edited by C. D. Cobham. London: Pamphlets. St. Vincent’s Press.
- Cobham, C. D. (1900). An Attempt at a Bibliography of Cyprus. Nicosia: Printed, for the Compiler, at the G.P.O.. 4th Ed.
- Hutchinson, J. T. & Cobham, C. D. (1907). A Handbook of Cyprus. London: Edward Stanford. 5th Ed.
- Cobham, C. D. (1908). Excerpta Cypria. Materials for a History of Cyprus. Cambridge: Cambridge University Press.
- Cobham, C. D. (1909). Travels in the Island of Cyprus. Translated from the Italian of Giovanni Mariti by Claude Delaval Cobham. With Contemporary Accounts to the Sieges of Nicosia and Famagusta. Cambridge: Cambridge University Press.
- Cobham, C. D. (1910). The churches and saints of Cyprus. London.
- Cobham, C. D. (1911). The Patriarchs of Constantinople. Cambridge: Cambridge University Press.
- Cobham, C. D. (1929). An Attempt at a Bibliography of Cyprus (G. Jeffery, Ed.; New Edition). Government Printing Office.

== See also ==
- George H. Everett Jeffery
- Theophilus Amin Halil Mogabgab
- Eshmun obelisk
