= Petros Clerides =

Attorney General of Cyprus
- In office 2005–2013
- Succeeded by: Costas Clerides

Personal details
- Born: 20 February 1946 (age 79); Nicosia, Cyprus
- Education: Pancyprian Gymnasium
- Alma mater: University of Athens

Petros Clerides (born 20 February 1946) is the former attorney general of Cyprus. He resigned in 2013, after widespread criticism of his handling of high-profile cases.

== Personal life ==
Petros Clerides was born on 20 February 1946 in Nicosia. He was educated at the Pancyprian Gymnasium, and the University of Athens, where he graduated in 1969 with a bachelor's degree in law.

== Career ==
Clerides was appointed deputy attorney general of Cyprus in 2000, and attorney general in 2005, resigned in June 2016, effective in September, and was replaced with Supreme Court judge Costas Clerides.

Clerides had faced calls to resign after reports that he had used his position to have a drink-driving prosecution against his son suspended. His son was over the alcohol limit, and the car did not have a MOT or road tax. Clerides "openly admitted on television that he had used his nolle prosequi powers to drop charges against his son related to driving offences."

Clerides was also criticised for his handling of the 2005 Helios air crash and Mari explosion trials, and over comments he made about an attempt to publicly seize a ministerial car for an unpaid government debt.

== Personal life ==
He is married to Danae Michaelidou, and they have two sons, both of whom are lawyers.
