= George H. E. Jeffery =

British architect and historian

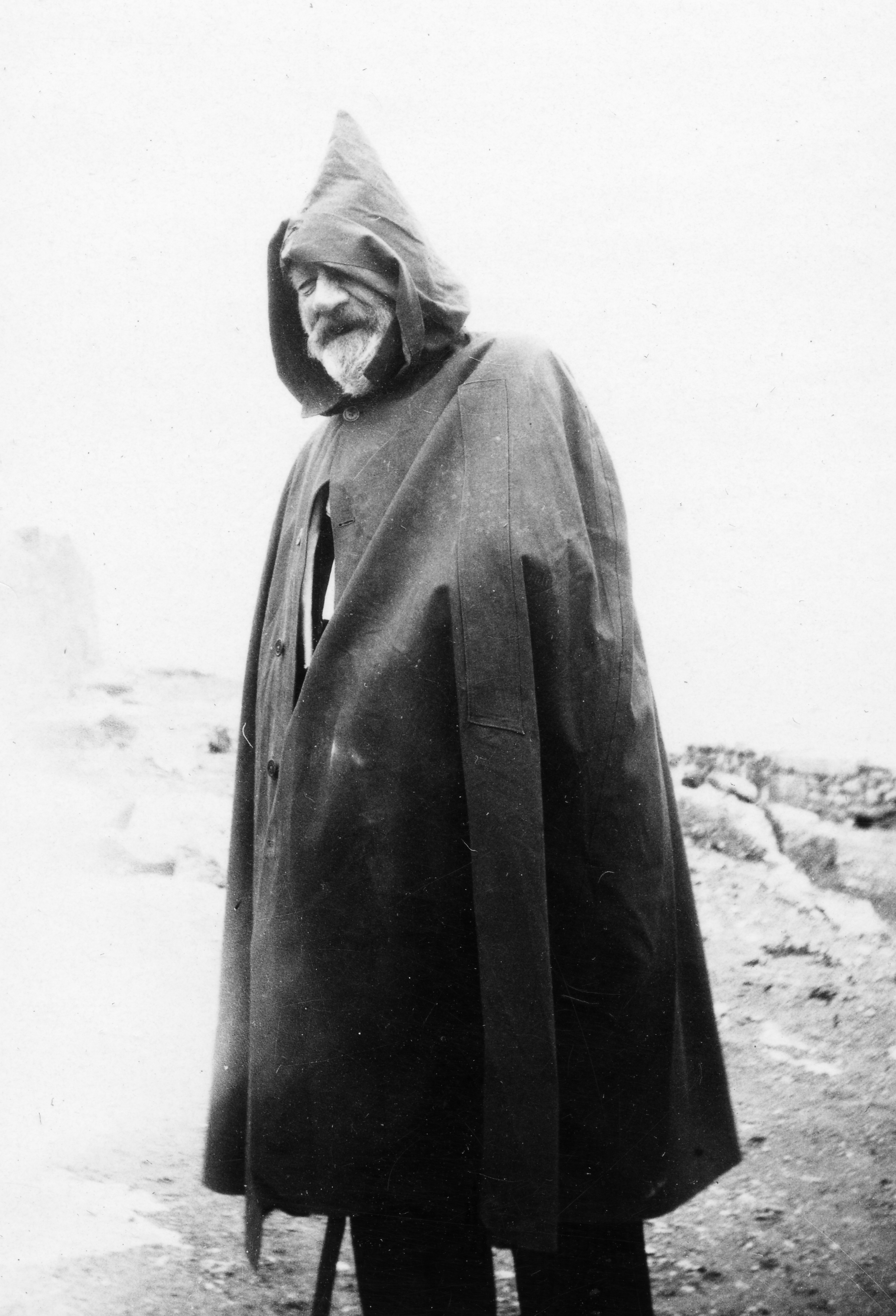
- Born: 1855
- Died: 1935 (aged 79–80)
- Occupations: Curator, antiquarian
- Spouse: Helen Jane Luxmore

George Henry Everett Jeffery, FSA (1855–1935) was the Curator of Ancient Monuments in the Department of Antiquities from 1903 until his death in 1935. He is known for his personal research and interest in the monuments of Cyprus. He supervised the construction of the Cyprus Museum from 1908.

== Career ==
Among his publications is the authoritative Description of the Historical Monuments of Cyprus, published in 1918 in the Government Printing Office and a second edition was published in 1983. This work focuses on the Byzantine and especially the Medieval monuments in the cities and villages of the island. Additionally, the work includes architectural plans of the monuments, made by Jeffery himself, and a few pictures.

More recently Jeffery's diaries have been studied and published by Despina Pilides.

Prior to his activities as Curator of Ancient Monuments in Cyprus, his main occupation was Architect. He trained from 1870 to 1874 at the S & A Department (forerunner of the Royal College of Art) in Kensington, London on a scholarship, followed from 1874 to 1881 by the Royal Academy of Arts. By his own account he travelled widely in Britain and abroad, including in the Middle East. In 1892 whilst living in Florence, Italy he was admitted as Fellow to the Royal Institute of British Architects.

Jeffery records in his application the offices that he had worked in and having worked on minor projects in practice in London, then from 1886 on alterations to the St. Mark's English Church in Florence, the St Augustine of Canterbury English Church in Wiesbaden, and the Christ Church in Bad (Langen-) Schwalbach, both in Germany.

In Wiesbaden 1890-1891 he was commissioned by a prominent congregation member and church warden Christopher Benson, the elder brother of the then-Archbishop of Canterbury to produce 2 paintings, a reredos screen for the chancel and stencilled wall decorations in a style reminiscent of George Bodley's work. Of Jeffery's works, only one of the paintings, that depicting St. Augustine, survived a catastrophic fire at the church in 1966, but historical photographs of the interior of the church are archived in the SAM Stadtmuseum Wiesbaden. Some years after Christopher Benson's death, his widow left for Lugano in Switzerland, where Jeffery also designed and built the Anglican Church of St. Edward the Confessor c. 1902.

From late 1892 he worked on mission buildings including a school and dispensary for Bishop George Francis Popham Blyth on a site near Mt. Carmel in Haifa, Palestine before designing the Anglican College in Jerusalem, whose collegiate church was consecrated in 1898, later as a cathedral. In this year, he submitted his design drawing for the college showing progress of construction to the Royal Academy of Arts and continued directing construction until completion in 1912.

Whilst working as Curator of Ancient Buildings in Cyprus he also designed the English College in Nicosia 1900 for Canon Frank Darvall Newham and supervised the construction of the Archaeological Museum of Cyprus in Nicosia.

== Personal life ==
He was born to Henry and Isabella Jeffery nee Everett. Both his father and grandfather were builders. After the death of his father in 1878, the family moved from Worcester Park, Surrey to West Hill, Sydenham opposite the new Crystal Palace, whereafter he appears to have emigrated permanently. By 1886 he lived or stayed regularly in Florence, Italy.

He was married to Helen Jane Luxmore. In 1913, she founded “Field Club”, the first tennis club in Cyprus.

== Publications ==
- Jeffery, George H. Everett. (1897). The mediæval art of Cyprus. The Builder, August 7, 190.
- Jeffery, George H. Everett. (1900). Venetian remains in Cyprus. The Builder 79, no. 2298, July 21, 47‑50.
- Jeffery, George H. Everett. (1900). The survival of Gothic architecture in Cyprus. Architectural review 8, 128‑136.
- Jeffery, George H. Everett. (1901). Archaeological activity in Cyprus. The Builder 81, no. 3049, July 13, 31‑32.
- Jeffery, George H. Everett. (1910). VII. The Present Condition of the Ancient Architectural Monuments of Cyprus., Archaeologia, 62(1), 125-136. doi:10.1017/S0261340900008110.
- Jeffery, George H. Everett. (1914). Report of the Curator of Ancient Monuments for the year 1914. Nicosia: Government Printing Office.
- Jeffery, George H. Everett. (1915) IV.—Rock-cutting and Tomb-architecture in Cyprus during the Graeco-Roman Occupation, Archaeologia, 66, pp. 159–178. doi:10.1017/S0261340900008389.
- Jeffery, George H. Everett. (1916). Report of the Curator of Ancient Monuments for the year ending 31 March 1916. Nicosia: Government Printing Office.
- Jeffery, George H. Everett. (1916). The Carmelite Church at Famagusta. Proceedings of the Society of Antiquaries of London, 28, 106–134.
- Jeffery, George H. Everett. (1918). A Description of the Historic Monuments of Cyprus. Studies in the archæology and architecture of the island. With illustrations [and plans], etc. Nicosia: W. J. Archer.
- Jeffery, George H. Everett. (1919). A Brief Description of the Holy Sepulchre, Jerusalem, and Other Christian Churches in the Holy City, With Some Account of the Mediæval Copies of the Holy Sepulchre Surviving in Europe. Cambridge: University Press.
- Jeffery, George H. Everett. (1922). Report of the Curator of Ancient Monuments for the year ending 31 March 1922. Nicosia: Government Printing Office.
- Jeffery, George H. Everett. (1925). A fourth-century basilica in Cyprus. The Antiquaries Journal. 5(3), 283-283. doi:10.1017/S0003581500092246
- Jeffery, George H. Everett. (1926). Cyprus Under an English King in the Twelfth Century. Cyprus: Printed at the Government Printing Office: Nicosia. Reprint London, 1973.
- Jeffery, George H. Everett. (1927). Report of the Curator of Ancient Monuments for the year ending 31 March 1927. Nicosia: Government Printing Office.
- Jeffery, George H. Everett. (1928). The Basilica of Constantia, Cyprus. The Antiquaries Journal. 8(3), 344-349. doi:10.1017/S0003581500012300
- Jeffery, George H. Everett. (1928). II.—Notes on the Origin of the Doric Style of Architecture, Archaeologia, 78, pp. 37–60. doi:10.1017/S0261340900013497.
- Cobham, Claude Delaval, and George H. Everett Jeffery. (1929). An Attempt at a Bibliography of Cyprus. Nicosia: Government Printing Office.
- Jeffery, George H. Everett. (1931). The Present Condition of the Historical Monuments of Cyprus. Nicosia: Government Printing Office.
- Jeffery, George H. Everett. (1932). The Granite Forum and Clepsydra, Salamina Altera, Cyprus, The Antiquaries Journal, 12(3), pp. 302–302. doi:10.1017/S0003581500043869.
- Jeffery, George H. Everett. (1932). Cyprus Monuments: Historical and Architectural Buildings. Nicosia: Government Printing Office.

== See also ==
- Claude Delaval Cobham
- Camille Enlart
- Rupert Gunnis
- Department of Antiquities, Cyprus
