= Kypros Chrysanthis =

Kypros Chrysanthis (Greek: Κύπρος Χρυσάνθης) (Nicosia, 1915 – 1998) was a Cypriot writer, doctor, educator, publisher, researcher and journalist, his contributions are considered especially important for Cypriot literary studies.

== Education and career ==
He was born in 1915 in Nicosia. In 1933 he graduated from the Pancyprian Gymnasium and studied medicine at the University of Athens graduating in 1939, becoming a doctor of medicine in the same university in 1948. Between 1951 and 1952 he specialized in paediatrics at the Institute of Child Health. He worked in Nicosia as a doctor starting in 1940. He also served as a school doctor from 1943 to 1985 and as a professor of hygiene at the Pancyprian Gymnasium (1944–1976) and at the Cyprus Pedagogical Academy (1961–1976).

He founded various medical and literary journals, including the medical journal Health (Υγεία), he was editor of the medical journal Medical Cyprus (Ιατρική Κύπρος). Additionally Chrysanthis, was one of the founding members and vice president of Cypriot Paediatric Society (Παιδιατρική Εταιρεία Κύπρου), vice president of the Society of Mental Health (Εταιρείας Ψυχικής Υγιεινής), and a member of the Council of Pharmacy and Poisons (Συμβουλίου Φαρμακευτικής και Δηλητηρίων).

== Cypriot literary studies ==
Chrysanthis was the president of the Society of Cypriot Studies (Εταιρία Κυπριακών Σπουδών) between 1986 and 1998. In 1969 he won the Poetry Award II for his book Lyric word (Λυρικός λόγος). He was the editor of the influential literary magazine Pneumatiki Kipros (Πνευματική Κύπρος) and Philologiki Kipros (Φιλολογική Κύπρος), the magazine has been digitised and made available online by the Open University of Cyprus. Additionally, Chrysanthis was a member of the publishing team of Laografiki Kipros (Λαογραφική Κύπρος), a journal on Cypriot folklore.

== Legacy ==
A bust of Chrysanthis was unveiled in 2018 by the President of Cyprus, Nicos Anastasiades, at the entrance of Pancyprian Gymnasium.

== Personal life ==
Chrysanthis was married to Loulla and has two children, Anthos and Panos.

== Publications ==
- Chrysanthis, K. (1945). The Personification of Plague and Cholera According to the Cypriots. Folklore, 56(2), 259–266.
- Chrysanthis, K. (1946). The Magic Numbers Three, Seven and Seventy-Two in Cypriote Folk-Medicine. Folklore, 57(2), 79–83.
- Chrysanthis, K. (1947). Stammering and Handedness. The Lancet, 249(6442), 270–271.
- Χρυσάνθης, Κ. (1948). Η κατά μήκος και βάρος σωματική αύξησις των Κυπρίων μαθητών. Λευκωσία: Τυπ. "Η Λευκωσία".
- Χρυσάνθης, Κ. (1950). Η κατά κεφάλαια διαίρεση της δημώδους ιατρικής. Κυπριακαί Σπουδαί, τόμ. Ι∆ ́, 207–209.
- Χρυσάνθης, Κ. (1950). Η σημασία και οι δικαιοδοσίες της δημώδους ιατρικής [The significance and jurisdictions of folk-medicine]. Cyprus Medical Journal, 3(8), 393–414. PMID 14783947.
- Chrysanthis, K. (1952). Polycentron. The British Medical Journal, 1(4755), 440–440.
- Χρυσάνθης, Κ. (1956). Η Τυπογραφία στην Κύπρο. Λευκωσία.
- Χρυσάνθης, Κ. (1961). Παλαιογραφικά, Κυπριακαί Σπουδαί, Τομ. ΚΕ'.
- Χρυσάνθης, Κ. (1964). Η στιχουργική του κυπριακού δημοτικού τραγουδιού. Λευκωσία: Πνευματική Κύπρος.
- Χρυσάνθης, Κ. (1969). Δελφικές αμφικτυονίες (μονόπρακτο). Λευκωσία: Πνευματική Κύπρος.
- Χρυσάνθης, Κ. (1975). Δυο Επιστολές της Λυντεκε που Σχετίζονται με την Κύπρο. Λαογραφική Κύπρος, τόμ. Ε', τευχ. 13'.
- Χρυσάνθης, Κ. (1988). Δημώδης Ιατρική της Κύπρου: Σύμμεικτα. Λευκωσία: Ιατρικός Συλλόγος "Ιπποκράτης".
- Χρυσάνθης, Κ. (1989). Επιστολές του Γλαύκου Αλιθέρση προς τον Κωστή Παλαμά. Λευκωσία: Πνευματική Κύπρος.
- Chrysanthis K. (1992). Le sonnet chez les poètes chypriotes. Cahiers du Centre d'Études Chypriotes. 17, 39–44.

== Publications about Chrysanthis ==
- Ποσάντζη, Β. Ε. (2003-2004). Δύο ανέκδοτα γράμματα του Κύπρου Χρυσάνθη στον ποιητή Όμηρο Μπεκέ. Επιστημονική Επετηρίς της Φιλοσοφικής Σχολής του Πανεπιστημίου Αθηνών, Τόμος 35, 253–265.
