= L. H. Dudley Buxton =

British anthropologist (1889–1939)

L. H. Dudley Buxton FSAS
- Photographed at an uncertain date.
- Born: Leonard Halford Dudley Buxton; 1889
- Died: 5 March 1939 (aged 49–50)

Academic background
- Education: Radley College
- Alma mater: Exeter College, Oxford

Academic work
- Institutions: University of Oxford
- Military career
- Allegiance: United Kingdom
- Branch: British Army
- Service years: 1914–1918
- Units: Queen's Own Cameron Highlanders; Intelligence Corps
- Wars: First World War

Leonard Halford Dudley Buxton FSAS (1889 – 5 March 1939), known as L. H. Dudley Buxton, was a British anthropologist.

== Education and career ==
He was educated at Radley College and at Exeter College, Oxford, and he was Reader in Physical Anthropology at the University of Oxford between 1928 and 1939. He conducted field work in Sudan, India, Malta, the United States, China and Mesopotamia, and in 1913 he excavated Lapithos in Cyprus under the direction of professor John Myres and Cyprus Museum curator Menelaos Markides. During his extensive travels he documented his work through photography; the pictures are currently in the Pitt Rivers Museum. In the 1930s he carried research in Oxford with anthropologist Beatrice Blackwood. He collected textiles that are currently in the Pitt Rivers Museum in Oxford, the Bankfield Museum in Halifax and the British Museum. From 1914 to 1918 he served with the Queen's Own Cameron Highlanders in France and in the Intelligence Corps. He died on 5 March 1939.

== Publications ==
=== As co-author ===
- Ray, M. B.; Dudley Buxton, L. H. (1914). "Some Pathological and Other Conditions Observed Among the Human Remains from a Prehistoric Ethiopian Cemetery in the Southern Sudan". In Frowde, Henry (ed.). Proceedings of the XVIIth International Congress of Medicine, London, 1913. London: Hodder and Stoughton. OCLC 772633966.
- Dudley Buxton, L. H.; Blackwood, Beatrice (1934). "An Introduction to Oxfordshire Folklore". Folklore. 45 (1): 29–46. doi:10.1080/0015587X.1934.9718530. JSTOR 1255759.
- Rix, M. M.; Dudley Buxton, L. H. (1938). "The Anthropology of Prehistoric Cyprus: An Account of Neolithic and Bronze Age Skulls Including the Results of an Expedition to the Eastern Mediterranean in the Winter 1937–1938". Man. 38 (July 1938): 91–92. doi:10.2307/2792930. JSTOR 2792930.
- Dudley Buxton, L. H.; Trevor, J. C.; Blackwood, Beatrice (1939). "Measurements of Oxfordshire Villagers". The Journal of the Royal Anthropological Institute of Great Britain and Ireland. 69 (1): 1–10. doi:10.2307/2844228. JSTOR 2844228.

=== As sole author ===
- Dudley Buxton, L. H. (1920). "The Anthropology of Cyprus". The Journal of the Royal Anthropological Institute of Great Britain and Ireland. 50: 183–235. doi:10.2307/2843379. JSTOR 2843379.
- — (1920). "The Inhabitants of the Eastern Mediterranean". Biometrika. 13 (1): 92–112. doi:10.2307/2331725. JSTOR 2331725.
- — (1921). "Notes on Cypriot Textiles". Man. 21 (February 1921): 17–19. doi:10.2307/2840728. JSTOR 2840728.
- — (1921). "Notes on Cypriot Textiles". Man. 21 (March 1921): 40–44. doi:10.2307/2840423. JSTOR 2840423.
- — (1921). "Notes on Cypriot Textiles". Man. 21 (April 1921): 50–55. doi:10.2307/2839231. JSTOR 2839231.
- — (1921). "Notes on Cypriot Textiles". Man. 21 (May 1921): 67–70. doi:10.2307/2840240. JSTOR 2840240.
- — (1922). "The Ethnology of Malta and Gozo". The Journal of the Royal Anthropological Institute of Great Britain and Ireland. 52: 164–211. doi:10.2307/2843733. JSTOR 2843733.
- — (1924). The Eastern Road. London: K. Paul, Trench, Trübner & Co. OCLC 403317.
- — (1924). Primitive Labour. London: Methuen. OCLC 4651949.
- — (1925). The Peoples of Asia. London: K. Paul, Trench, Trübner & Co. OCLC 869358.
- — (1931). "Künstlich deformierte Schädel von Cypern" [Artificially Deformed Skulls from Cyprus]. Anthropologischer Anzeiger (in German). 7 (3/4): 236–240. JSTOR 29535735.
- — (1931). "A Cloisonné Staff-Head from Cyprus". Man. 32: 1–2. doi:10.2307/2789760. JSTOR 2789760.
