= Karkotis =

River in Cyprus

Coordinates: 35°09′29″N 32°51′57″E

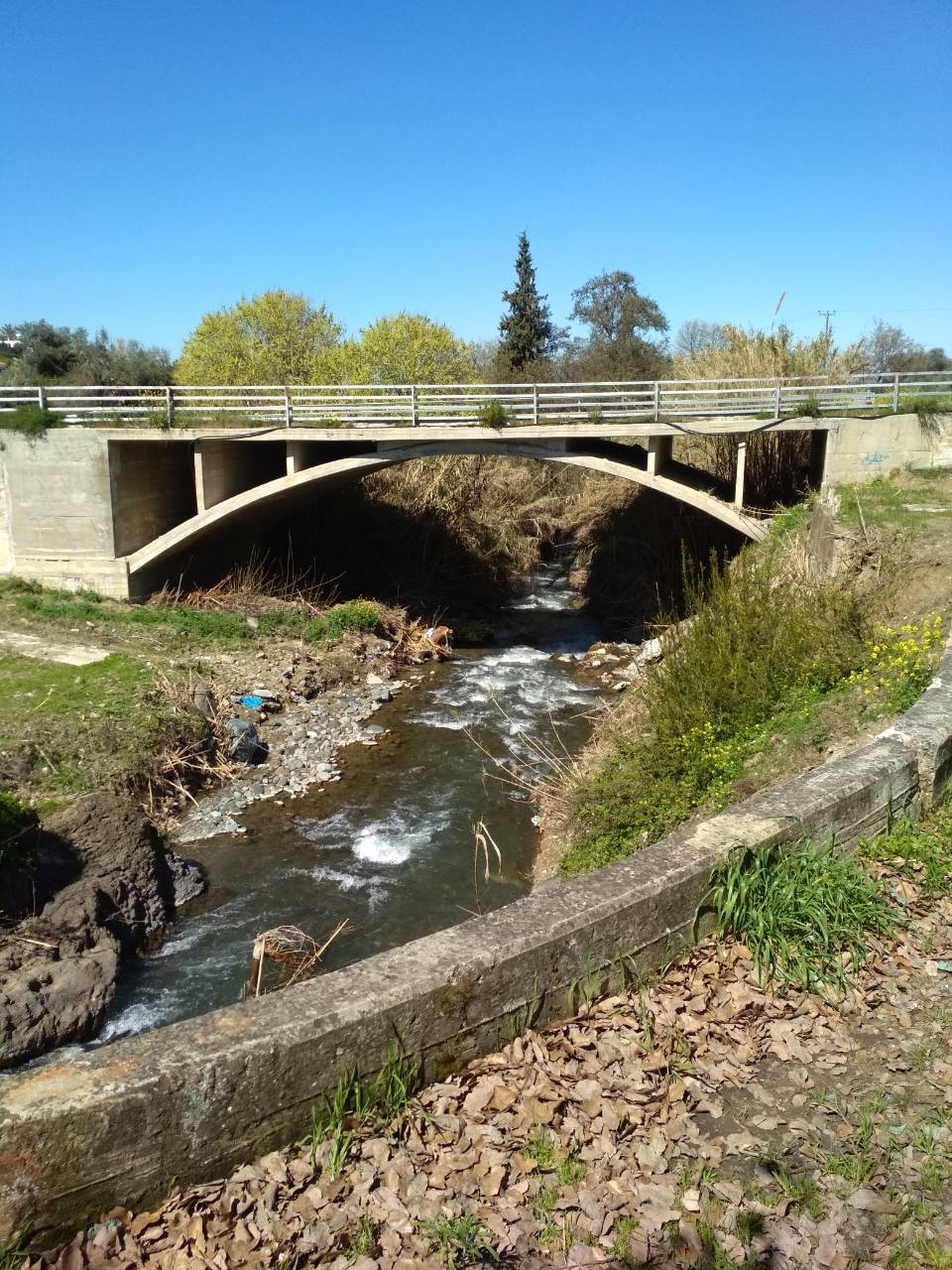
River Karkotis as seen from the old bridge of Evrychou

The river Karkotis (Greek: Καρκώτης) is a river in Cyprus. It is also known as Klarios River (Greek: Κλάριος). Its source is on the northeastern slopes of the Troodos Mountains. It crosses the Solea valley and empties into the Morfou bay. It has a length of 24,750 m (81,200 ft). The river has created the unique valley of Solea, rich in vegetation and fruit trees. Along the river there are artificial canals, through which the water is led to the villages of the valley. Karkotis is the only non-intermittent river of Cyprus.
