= Konstantinos Spyridakis =

- Κωνσταντίνος Σπυριδάκις

President of the Greek Communal Chamber
- In office 1960–1965
- Constituency: Nicosia

Minister of Education and Culture
- In office 1965–1970
- President: Makarios III
- Succeeded by: Frixos Petrides

Personal details
- Born: 1903 Nicosia, Cyprus
- Died: 1976 (aged 72–73)
- Education: Pancyprian Gymnasium
- Alma mater: University of Athens; University of Berlin
- Occupation: Politician, Educator, Scholar, Writer
- Awards: Goethe Medal
- Scientific career
- Thesis: Eüagoras I. von Salamis: Untersuchungen zur Geschichte des Kyprischen Königs (1935)
- Doctoral advisor: Werner Jaeger

Konstantinos Spyridakis (Greek: Κωνσταντίνος Σπυριδάκις; 1903–1976) was a Greek Cypriot politician, educator, scholar and writer, who served as the first Minister of Education of the Republic of Cyprus (1965–1970). After studying history, philosophy, and philology in Athens and Berlin, he worked as a teacher, becoming headmaster of Pancyprian Gymnasium (1936–1960). His community and political roles included membership of the Ethnarchical Council and advisor to the Cyprus Ethnarchy Office (1948–1960), and president of the Greek Communal Chamber of Cyprus (1960–1965).

== Early life and education ==
Konstantinos Spyridakis was born in Ayios Antonios, Nicosia. His father was Spyridon Spyridakis (Σπυρίδων Σπυριδάκης) from Makrino in Epirus, Greece, who from 1924 to 1925 was headmaster of Pancyprian Gymnasium, the same school Konstantinos would later head. His mother Aglaia Oikonomidou (Αγλαία Οικονομίδου) was from Kythrea and a descendant of Archbishop Chrysanthos.

Spyridakis graduated from the City School of Ayios Antonios (Αστική Σχολή Αγίου Αντωνίου) and then in 1919 graduated from Pancyprian Gymnasium at the age of 16. Between 1919 and 1923 he studied at the Faculty of Philosophy of the University of Athens (NKUA). In 1931 at the age of 28 he went to Germany for further studies under the classist Werner Jaeger in the University of Berlin, graduating with a doctorate on Evagoras I of Salamis in 1934. His postgraduate studies were funded with a scholarship from the Archibishophoric.

== Career ==
At the age of 20 he taught philology at the Pancyprian Gymnasium, from 1923 until 1931. In 1934 Spyridakis returned to Cyprus from Germany and resumed working as a teacher at Pancyprian Gymnasium (1934–1935), deputy headmaster (1935–1936) and finally as the headmaster of Pancyprian Gymnasium from 1936 until 1960. After independence on 31 March 1965 president Makarios appointed his as the first Minister of Education of the newly independent Republic of Cyprus, serving in that capacity until 30 June 1970.

Among his students were the future president Makarios III and archaeologist Vassos Karageorghis. He was a proponent of Greek nationalism and Greek-focused education in Cypriot schools. He supported Enosis, he was against the British presence in Cyprus but he did not believe that an armed struggle, through EOKA, would achieve that goal.

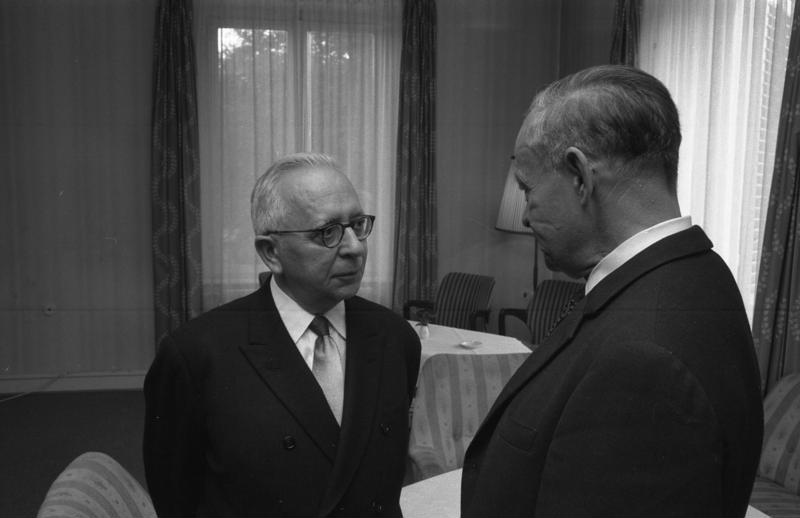
Konstantinos Spyridakis (left) with German diplomat Rolf Otto Lahr (right)

=== Academic and professional societies ===
Spyridakis founded the Center for Scientific Research (Κέντρο Επιστημονικών Ερευνών; 1962); he was the founder and president of the Society of Cypriot Studies (Εταιρεία Κυπριακών Σπουδών; 1936–1976), and among the founders and a president of the Greek Intellectual Club of Cyprus (Ελληνικός Πνευματικός Ομίλος Κύπρου; 1947–1976). He was a founding member and president of the Association of Greek Philologists of Cyprus "Stasinos" (Συνδέσμου Ελλήνων Φιλολόγων Κύπρου «Στασίνος»; 1962–1974), and the Union of Secondary Education Teachers (ΟΕΛΜΕΚ; 1953–1959). He was honorary president of the National Society of Greek Authors of Cyprus (Εθνική Εταιρεία Ελλήνων Λογοτεχνών Κύπρου) and the Cyprus Pedagogical Research Association (Ομίλος Παιδαγωγικών Ερευνών Κύπρου).

Spyridakis was a corresponding member of the Academy of Athens, the Ionian Academy and the Parnassos Literary Society. He was an honorary member of the Athens Scientific Society (Eν Αθήναις Επιστημονική Εταιρεία), the Society of Macedonian Studies (Εταιρεία Μακεδονικών Σπουδών) and the Hellenic Folklore Society (Ελληνική Λαογραφική Εταιρεία). He was awarded an honorary doctorate from the Aristotelian University of Thessaloniki.

== Legacy ==
Spyridakis died in Trypiotis in 1976. After his death, Archbishop Makarios founded in his memory the 'Konstantinos Spyridakis Scholarship Foundation' under the auspices of the Church of Cyprus. In 2021 the Ministry of Education unveiled a bust of Spyridakis in its headquarters. In the academic world, he is noted for his work on the constitution of Iron Age city-kingdoms. Additionally, he is considered one of the academics that promoted a Hellenocentric historiography of Cyprus. In 1986, the Academy of Athens posthumously published his monumental work on the History of Cyprus. In 2003 he was commemorated in a stamp by the Cyprus post, for the centenary of his birth.

== Personal life ==
In 1937 he married Thalia Kissonergi (Θάλεια Κισσονέργη) and they had two sons: Andreas (born 1944), became a lawyer in Nicosia; and Philokypros (born 1949), practised as a doctor in Athens.

== Honours ==
- Grand Cross of the Order of the Phoenix
- Gold and silver medal of the Greek Orthodox Patriarchate of Jerusalem
- Goethe Medal
- Silver medal, Panteion University
- Gold medal of Apostole Barnabas, Church of Cyprus

== Publications ==
- Spyridakis, K. (1935). Eüagoras I. von Salamis: Untersuchungen zur Geschichte des Kyprischen Königs. Stuttgart: Kohlhammer.
- Σπυριδάκις, Κ. (1937). Συμβολή εις την ιστορίαν της πολιτείας του αρχαίου Ιδαλίου: (κατά τον 5 αι. π.Χ.). Εν Λευκωσία: Τυπ. Νέος Κόσμος.
- Σπυριδάκις, Κ. (1938). Η αρχαία κυπριακή ποίησις. Εν Λευκωσία.
- Σπυριδάκις, Κ. (1939). Κοινόν Κυπρίων. Εν Λευκωσία.
- Σπυριδάκις, Κ. (1940). Μικραὶ συμβολαὶ εἰς τὴν ἱστορίαν τῆς Ἑλληνιστικῆς Κύπρου. Νικοκλῆς ὁ Πάφιος. Κυπριακαί Σπουδαί Γ'. 1–11.
- Σπυριδάκις, Κ. (1944). Κύπρος και Αθήναι εις την αρχαιότητα. Λευκωσία.
- Σπυριδάκις, Κ. (1944). Η ιστορία του Παγκυπρίου Γυμνασίου: από της ιδρύσεως αυτού (1893) μέχρι της συμπληρώσεως πεντηκονταετίας (1943). Εν Λευκωσία.
- Σπυριδάκις, Κ. (1945). Η διδασκαλία της αρχαίας ελληνικής γλώσσης εις τα σχολεία μας της Μέσης Παιδείας. Λευκωσία.
- Σπυριδάκις, Κ. (1945). Η Μονή Μακεδονιτίσσης της Αρχιεπισκοπής Κύπρου. Εν Λευκωσία: Τυπ. Νέος Κόσμος.
- Σπυριδάκις, Κ. (1945). Περσαίος ο Κιτιεύς φιλόσοφος. Λευκωσία.
- Σπυριδάκις, Κ. (1946). Η γνησιότης των στίχων 904–920 της Αντιγόνης του Σοφοκλέους. Λευκωσία.
- Σπυριδάκις, Κ. (1946). Ευέλθων και Φερετίμη: (Ηροδ. IV 162). Λευκωσία.
- Σπυριδάκις, Κ. (1947). Αυτή είναι η Κύπρος. Λευκωσία: Ένωσις Συλλόγων Ελλήνων Απόφοιτων Κύπρου (Ε.Σ.Ε.Α.Κ.).
- Σπυριδάκις, Κ. (1947). Η οικονομική πολιτική των βασιλέων της αρχαίας Κύπρου. Λευκωσία.
- Σπυριδάκις, Κ. (1947). Περί τον Ιλαρίωνα Κιγάλαν. Λευκωσία.
- Σπυριδάκις, Κ. (1948). "Κύπριος χαρακτήρ" παρ' Αισχύλω: (Ικέτ. 227 κ.ε.). Εν Λευκωσία.
- Σπυριδάκις, Κ. (1948). Αι Κυπριακαί σπουδαί εις το παρελθόν και σήμερον. Εν Λευκωσία.
- Σπυριδάκις, Κ. (1948). Οι άγιοι Καρπασίας Φίλων, Συνέσιος, Θύρσος, Φωτεινή, Σωζόμενος: Εισαγωγή στην έκδοση των ακολουθιών και των συναξαρίων. Εν Λευκωσία.
- Σπυριδάκις, Κ. (1948). Η Ρόδος και αι λοιπαί Δωδεκάνησοι ιστορικώς εξεταζόμεναι. Εν Λευκωσία: Τυπ. Λευκωσία.
- Σπυριδάκις, Κ. (1948). Αι Αθήναι του Περικλέους. Λευκωσία.
- Σπυριδάκις, Κ. (1948). Ο Ρήγας και η εθνική ελληνική παράδοσις. Λευκωσία.
- Σπυριδάκις, Κ. (1949). Κύπρος και Ελλάς εις την αρχαιότητα. Εν Λευκωσία: Γραφείον Εθναρχίας Κύπρου.
- Σπυριδάκις, Κ. (1950). Μιχαήλ Βολονάκης. Λευκωσία.
- Σπυριδάκις, Κ. (1950). Σύντομος ιστορία του Ενωτικού ζητήματος της Κύπρου. Εν Λευκωσία: Γραφείον Εθναρχίας Κύπρου.
- Σπυριδάκις, Κ. (1950). Ο Επιτάφιος του Περικλέους και αι εν αυτώ πολιτικαί σκέψεις του Θουκυδίδου (ΙΙ 35–46). Λευκωσία.
- Σπυριδάκις, Κ. (1950). Η περιγραφή της Μονής Κύκκου: επί τη βάσει ανεκδότου χειρογράφου. Εν Λευκωσία: Εταιρεία Κυπριακών Σπουδών.
- Spyridakis, K. (1950). A brief history of the Cyprus Question. Nicosia.
- Σπυριδάκις, Κ. (1951). Νικοκλής ο Πάφιος. Εν Λευκωσία: Τυπ. Νέος Κόσμος.
- Σπυριδάκις, Κ. (1952). Συμβολή εις την μελέτην της πολιτείας Ζήνωνος του Κιτιέως. Εν Λευκωσία.
- Σπυριδάκις, Κ. (1952). Παρατηρήσεις επί της πολιτικής του Ονησίλου. Εν Λευκωσία.
- Σπυριδάκις, Κ. (1952). Η εκπαιδευτική πολιτική της εν Κύπρω Αγγλικής κυβερνήσεως (1878–1952). Εν Λευκωσία: Γραφείον Εθναρχίας Κύπρου.
- Spyridakis, C. (1957). An outline of the history of Cyprus from the most ancient times to the present day. Nicosia: The Cyprus Ethnarchy Office.
- Σπυριδάκις, Κ. (1961). Λόγος επιμνημόσυνος κατά το εν των Παγκύπριω Γυμνασίω φιλολογικόν μνημόσυνον του Κωνσταντίνου Αμάντου. Λευκωσία Εκδόσεις "Κυπριακής Εκπαιδεύσεως".
- Spyridakis, K. (1962). A survey of the history of Cyprus. Cyprus: Greek Communal Chamber.
- Σπυριδάκις, Κ. (1963). Κύπριοι βασιλείς του 4 αι. π.Χ. (411–311/10 π.Χ.): μετά εισαγωγής περί του ελληνικού χαρακτήρος της αρχαίας κυπριακής ιστορίας. Εν Λευκωσία: Εταιρεία Κυπριακών Σπουδών.
- Spyridakis, K. (1964). A brief history of Cyprus. Chicago: Argonaut.
- Σπυριδάκις, Κ. (1964). Σύντομος ιστορία της Κύπρου. Εν Λευκωσία: Τμήμα Δημοσιεύσεων Ελληνικής Κοινοτικής Συνελεύσεως Κύπρου.
- Σπυριδάκις, Κ. (1967). Η εν Κύπρω εκπαιδευτική πολιτική: ομιλία εν τη Βουλή των Αντιπροσώπων τη 30ή Μαρτίου 1967. Λευκωσία: Κυπριακή Εκπαίδευσις.
- Σπυριδάκις, Κ. (1968). Το εν Κύπρω εκπαιδευτικόν σύστημα : ιστορία, ανάγκαι, και προοπτικαί τινές του μέλλοντος. Λευκωσία: "Κυπριακή Εκπαίδευσις".
- Σπυριδάκις, Κ. (1972–1974). Μελέται, διαλέξεις, λόγοι, άρθρα. τ.Α'.: (μέρ.1–3) Ιστορικοφιλολογικαί μελέται και διαλέξεις – τ.Β'.: (μέρ.1–2) Εκπαιδευτικαί κατευθύνσεις και μακροί αγώνες προστασίας και διατηρήσεως της ελληνικής παιδείας εν Κύπρω - τ.Γ'.: Μελέται, διαλέξεις, λόγοι, άρθρα. Εν Λευκωσία.
