= John Myres =

British archaeologist and academic (1869–1954)

Sir John Linton Myres OBE FBA FRAI
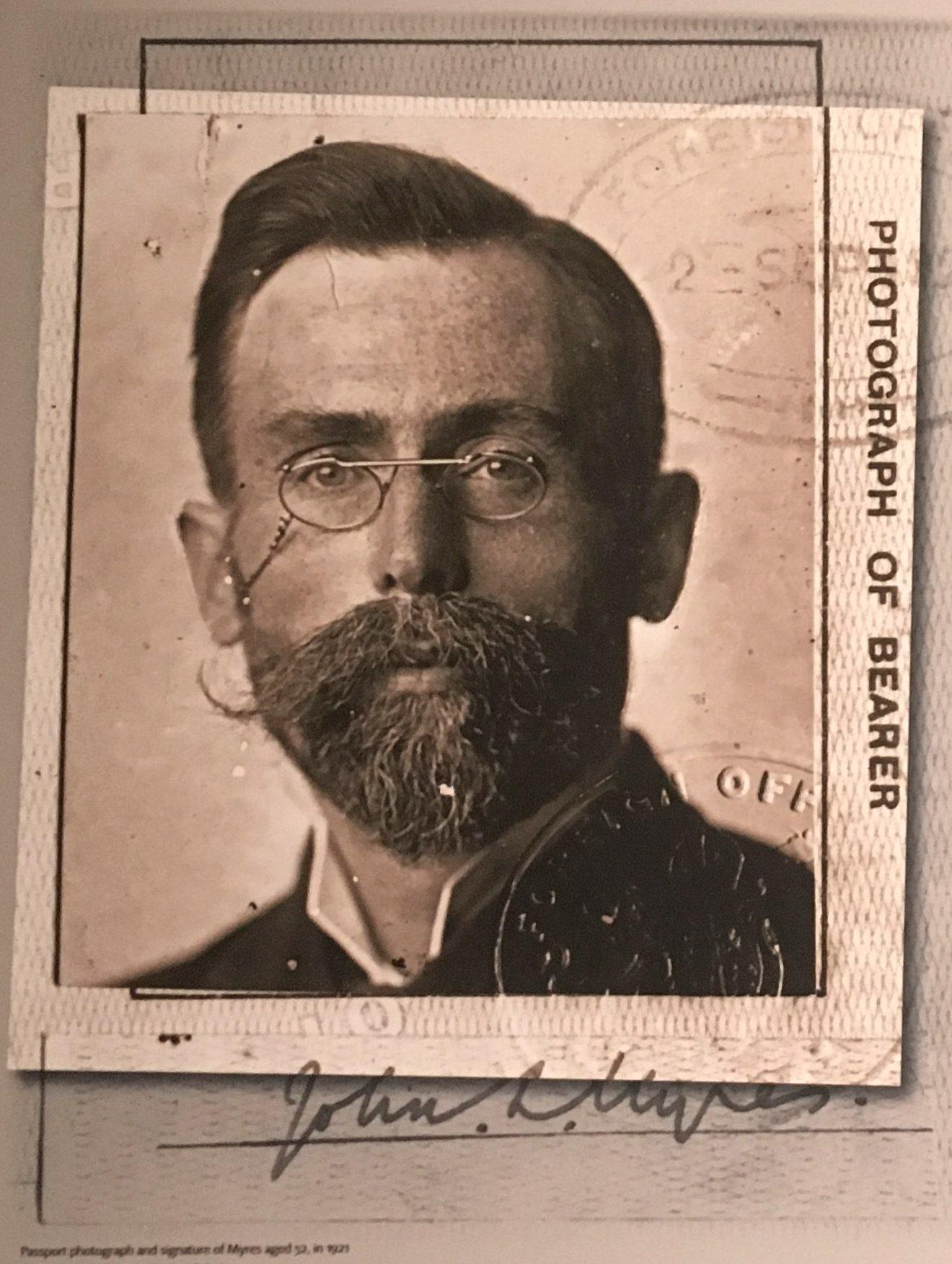
- Passport photograph and signature, 1921
- Born: July 3, 1869; Preston, Lancashire, England
- Died: March 6, 1954 (aged 84); Oxford

Academic background
- Education: Winchester College; New College, Oxford

Academic work
- Institutions: University of Liverpool; University of Oxford
- Influenced: Vere Gordon Childe

Sir John Linton Myres OBE FBA FRAI (3 July 1869 – 6 March 1954) was a British archaeologist and academic, who conducted excavations in Cyprus during the late 19th and early 20th centuries. Having been a fellow at Magdalen College, Oxford and then Christ Church, Oxford, he was briefly Gladstone Professor of Greek at the University of Liverpool (1907–1910). Having returned to the University of Oxford, he was the first Wykeham Professor of Ancient History from 1910 until 1939. During the First World War, he served with the Royal Naval Volunteer Reserve in the Eastern Mediterranean.

== Early life and education ==
John Lynton Myres was the son of the Rev. William Miles Myres and his wife, Jane Linton, and was educated at Winchester College, then an all-boys independent boarding school. He studied Literae humaniores (i.e. classics) at New College, Oxford, achieving first class honours in both Mods and Greats, and graduated with a Bachelor of Arts (BA) degree in 1892. During the same year he was a Craven Fellow at the British School at Athens (BSA) with which he excavated at the Minoan sanctuary of Petsofas on Crete.

== Pre-war career ==
Following his graduation, Myres was elected as a fellow of Magdalen College, Oxford in 1892. He travelled widely throughout the Mediterranean, collecting antiquities and taking copies of inscriptions. In 1895, he moved college and was elected a student (i.e. fellow) and tutor at Christ Church, Oxford. He was additionally a university lecturer in classical archaeology from January 1903.

In 1894, Myres participated in the British Museum's excavations at Amathus on Cyprus; he also excavated for the BSA, with the assistance of the Cyprus Exploration Fund, various sites such as Kalopsida, Laxia tou Riou, Kition and the Bronze Age site of Ayia Paraskevi. Myres gave his share of the finds to the University of Oxford, where they form a large part of the Cypriot collection of the Ashmolean Museum. In 1899, Myres published the first catalogue of the Cyprus Museum, in collaboration with the German archaeologist Max Ohnefalsch-Richter. He founded the anthropological journal Man and was its first editor from 1901 to 1903. He was considered as a possible director of the BSA to replace Robert Carr Bosanquet, who resigned in 1905, but was ultimately discounted: his fellow unsuccessful candidate Duncan Mackenzie wrote that a "Cambridge combine" had acted to prevent the appointment of an Oxford-based candidate.

Myres became Gladstone Professor of Greek and a lecturer in ancient geography at the University of Liverpool in 1907. However, he soon returned to the University of Oxford, where he had been selected as the first Wykeham Professor of Ancient History in 1910. He contributed to the 11th edition of the Encyclopædia Britannica, published between 1910 and 1911.

He also performed excavations at Lapithos in 1913 with Leonard Halford Dudley Buxton, and in 1914 published a handbook of the Luigi Palma di Cesnola collection in the Metropolitan Museum of Art.

== First World War ==
During the First World War, Myres served in Royal Naval Volunteer Reserve as part of the Naval Intelligence Division of the British Admiralty. He was given command of three former civilian vessels – a motorised caïque (fishing boat), a tugboat and a former royal yacht – which he used to raid along the Turkish shore of the Aegean Sea, stealing cattle to prevent them from being shipped to Germany. During one such raid, he captured around 2000 cattle. Myres's raids earned him the nickname "the Blackbeard of the Aegean": Francis Elliot, the British minister in Athens, complained about them to John de Robeck, Myres's naval superior, who dismissed the complaint as "extremely silly". According to Myres's subordinates, his operations attracted the commitment of 6,000 Ottoman troops; he received the Order of the British Empire and the Greek Order of George I for his service, and was promoted to lieutenant commander.

In 1916, Myres claimed to have discovered that the German archaeologist Theodor Wiegand was using his house near the Temple of Apollo at Didyma as an armoury, in which a German armourer was refitting rifles smuggled there from Greece for Ottoman service. Myres reported the matter to the Royal Navy, which tasked a destroyer to bombard and destroy the house: Myres flew in one of the two aircraft spotting for the ship, with responsibility for ordering a halt to the bombardment if the temple were in danger of damage. In 1917, he suggested that the BSA be used as a formal institution of British intelligence: his proposal was initially welcomed by the Foreign Office, but by early 1918 had been rejected by both that organisation and the BSA's managing committee.

In July 1917, Myres was mentioned in despatches.

== Later career and legacy ==
Myres was a member of the Folklore Society and served as its president between 1924 and 1926. Later he became president of the Royal Anthropological Institute between 1928 and 1931. He was also president of the Society for the Promotion of Hellenic Studies between 1935 and 1938. He was an advisor during the drafting of the 1935 Cypriot Antiquities Law and the initiation of the country's Department of Antiquities.

According to Robert Ranulph Marett,

Professor Myres, whilst he teaches Greek language and literature as the modern man would have them taught, and is a learned archaeologist to boot, yet can have no greater title to our respect than that, of many devoted helpers, he did the most to organize an effective school of Anthropology in the University of Oxford.

He was a major influence on the British-Australian archaeologist Vere Gordon Childe. The Myres Archive is located in the Ashmolean Museum.

At Oxford, Myres worked for the Director of Naval Intelligence. He contributed to the British Naval Intelligence Division Geographical Handbook Series that was published during the Second World War.

In the 1943 King's Birthday Honours, he was appointed a Knight Bachelor "for services to learning", and thereby granted the title sir. He was knighted by the King during a ceremony on 13 July at Buckingham Palace.

== Works ==
- Excavations in Cyprus in 1894 (1897)
- Copper and Bronze in Cyprus and South-East Europe (1898)
- A catalogue of the Cyprus museum, with a chronicle of excavations undertaken since the British occupation, and introductory notes on Cypriote archaeology (1899)
- Notes on the History of the Kabyle Pottery (1902)
- The value of ancient history (1910)
- The Dawn of History (New York/London: Holt/Williams and Norgate, 1911)
- Herodotus : Outline Analysis of Books I-Vl (Oxford: Hart [printer], 1912).
- Handbook of the Cesnola collection of antiquities from Cyprus (1914)
- Notes on the 'Prison of Saint Catharine' at Salamis in Cyprus (1915)
- The influence of anthropology on the course of political science (1916)
- Sarcophagus from Amathus, Sarcophagus from Golgi (1926)
- The Political Ideas of the Greeks (1927)
- Who were the Greeks? (Berkeley: University of California Press, 1930), Sather Lectures ISSN 0080-6684
- The Early Pot-Fabrics of Asia Minor (1930)
- The Cretan Labyrinth: A Retrospect of Aegean Research (1933)
- The Amathus Bowl: A Long-Lost Masterpiece of Oriental Engraving (1933)
- A Modern 'Kernos' Vessel from Tiflis (1937)
- A 'Kernos,' or Ring-Vase, in the Museum of Fine Arts, Boston, Massachusetts (1939)
- Excavations in Cyprus, 1913 (1940–1945)
- Lápithos (Lampousa: Acheiropoiétos): Acropolis devastated by Quarrying (1945)
- The Ancient Site at Lampousa (1945)
- Concentric Circle Ornament on Vessels of Wood from the Taurus (1952)
- Herodotus, Father of History (Oxford: Clarendon Press, 1953)
