= Costas Clerides =

Cypriot lawyer, judge and attorney general

Costas J. Clerides
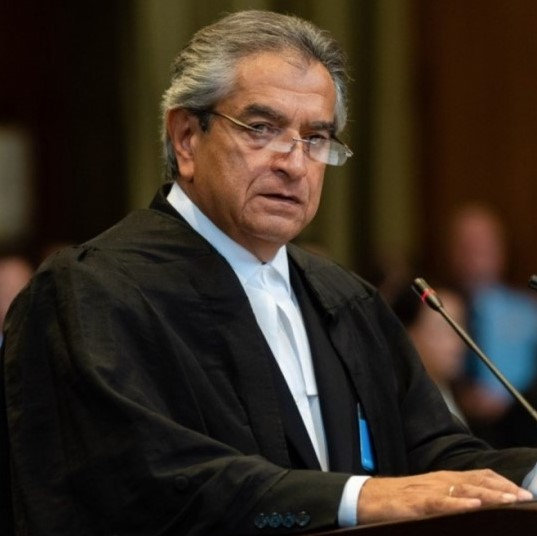
- Born: 1952 (age 73–74); Nicosia, Cyprus
- Education: Pancyprian Gymnasium
- Known for: Attorney general of Cyprus, 2013-2020
- Parent: Lefkos Clerides
- Relatives: Glafkos Clerides (first cousin once removed)

Costas J. Clerides (born 1952) is a former attorney general of Cyprus having served between 2013 – 2020.

== Personal life ==
Costas Clerides was born in 1952 in Nicosia, and educated at the Pancyprian Gymnasium until 1970. He is the son of Lefkos Clerides, and first cousin once removed of Glafkos Clerides, who was President of Cyprus from 1993 to 2003.

Clerides served as an officer in the Cyprus National Guard for two years, before reading law in London, where he was called to the Bar at the Middle Temple.

Clerides is married, and has one son.

== Career ==
Clerides practiced law for 10 years as a partner in the law firm Lefkos Clerides and Sons.

In 1988, Clerides was appointed a district judge, and senior district judge in 1996, and in 1997 he was promoted to district court president. On 27 April 2009, he was appointed to the Supreme Court of Cyprus and retired on 10 September 2013 when he was appointed as Attorney General of the Republic.
