= Prehistoric Cyprus =

Period of history

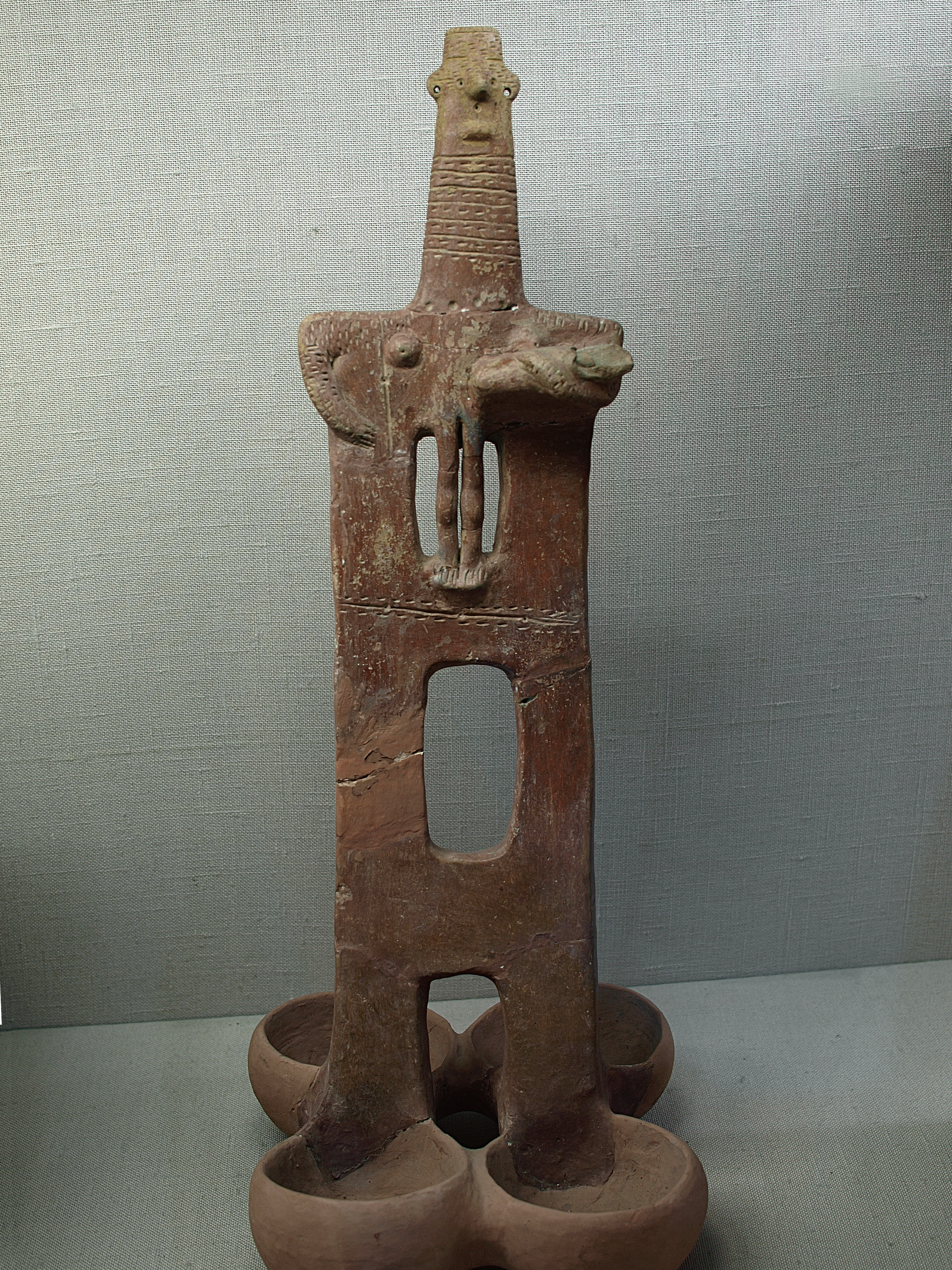
Bronze Age idol from Cyprus Museum, Nikosia. 2400–2000 BC

The Prehistoric Period is the oldest part of Cypriot history. This article covers the period 11,000 to 800 BC and ends immediately before the documented history of Cyprus begins.

== Paleolithic ==
Prior to the arrival of humans in Cyprus, only four terrestrial mammal species were present on the island, including the Cypriot pygmy hippopotamus and the Cyprus dwarf elephant, which were much smaller than their mainland ancestors as a result of insular dwarfism. The ancestors of these species arrived on Cyprus at least 200,000 years ago, with the other species being the Cypriot genet and the still living Cypriot mouse. The earliest humans to inhabit Cyprus were hunter gatherers who arrived on the island around 11,000–10,000 BC, with some of the oldest well-dated sites being Aetokremnos on the south coast, which is suggested to show evidence of hunting of the dwarf hippopotamus and dwarf elephant, and the inland site of Roudias in southeast Cyprus. These hunter-gatherers are suggested to have originated from the Natufian culture of the neighbouring Levant. The last records of the endemic mammals other than the mouse date to shortly after human settlement. The hunter gatherers later introduced wild boar to the island around 12,000 years ago, likely to act as a source of food.

== Neolithic ==
=== Aceramic Neolithic ===
The oldest evidence of Neolithic settlement is dated to 8800–8600 BC. The first settlers were already agriculturalists (PPNB), but did not yet produce pottery (aceramic Neolithic). They introduced dogs, sheep, goats and maybe cattle and pigs as well as numerous wild animals like foxes and Persian fallow deer that were previously unknown on the island. The PPNB settlers built round houses with floors made of terrazzo of burned lime (e.g. Kastros, Shillourokambos, Tenta) and cultivated einkorn and emmer. Pigs, sheep, goats and cattle were kept, but remained morphologically wild. Evidence for cattle (attested at Shillourokambos) is rare and when they apparently died out in the course of the 8th millennium they were not reintroduced until the early Bronze Age.

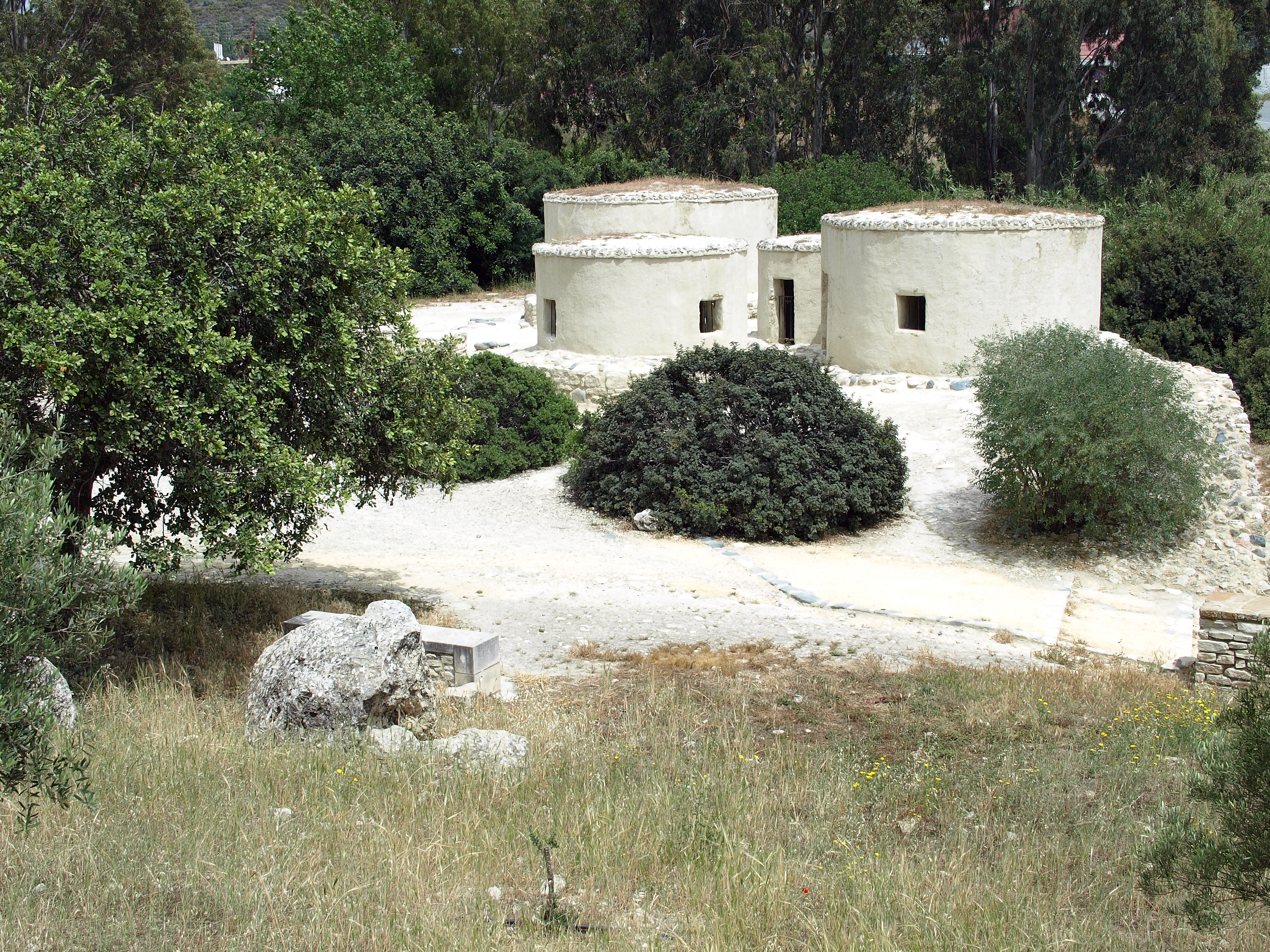
Neolithic archeological site at Choirokoitia (reconstruction)

In the 6th millennium BC, the aceramic Choirokoitia culture (Neolithic I) was characterized by round houses (tholoi), stone vessels and an economy based on sheep, goats and pigs. The daily life of the people in those Neolithic villages was spent in farming, hunting, animal husbandry and the lithic industry, while homesteaders (likely women) were engaged in spindling and weaving cloths, in addition to their probable participation in other activities. The lithic industry was the most individual feature of the Choirokoitia culture and many stone vessels made of grey andesite have been discovered during excavations. The houses had a foundation of river pebbles and the remainder of the building was constructed out of mudbricks. Sometimes several round houses were joined together to form a kind of compound. Some of these houses reach a diameter of up to 10 m (33 ft). Inhumation burials are located inside the houses.

Water wells discovered by archaeologists in western Cyprus are believed to be among the oldest in the world, dated at 9,000 to 10,500 years old, putting them in the Stone Age. They are said to show the sophistication of early settlers, and their heightened appreciation for the environment.

Plant remains indicate the cultivation of cereals, lentils, beans, peas and a kind of plum called bullace. Remains of the following animal species were recovered during excavations: Persian fallow deer, goat, sheep, mouflon and pig. More remains indicate Red deer, Roe deer, a kind of horse and a kind of dog but no cattle as yet.

Life expectancy seems to have been short; the average age at death appears to have been about 34 years, and there was high infant mortality.

In 2004, the remains of an 8-month-old cat were discovered buried with its human owner at a Neolithic archeological site in Cyprus. The grave is estimated to be 9,500 years old, predating Egyptian civilization and pushing back the earliest known feline-human association significantly.

=== Ceramic Neolithic ===
The aceramic civilisation of Cyprus came to an end quite abruptly around 6000 BC. It was probably followed by a vacuum of almost 1,500 years until around 4500 BC with the emergence of Neolithic II (Ceramic Neolithic).

At this time newcomers arrived in Cyprus introducing a new Neolithic era. The main settlement that embodies most of the characteristics of the period is Sotira near the south coast of Cyprus. The following ceramic Sotira phase (Neolithic II) has monochrome vessels with combed decoration. It had nearly fifty houses, usually having a single room that had its own hearth, benches, platforms and partitions that provided working places. The houses were on the main free-standing, with relatively thin walls and tended to be square with rounded corners. The sub-rectangular houses had two or three rooms. In Khirokitia, the remains of the Sotira phase overlay the aceramic remains. There are Sotira-ceramics in the earliest levels of Erimi as well. In the north of the island, the ceramic levels of Troulli may be synchronous with Sotira in the south.

The Late Neolithic is characterised by a red-on white ware. The late Neolithic settlement of Kalavassos-Pamboules has sunken houses.

=== Chalcolithic ===
The Neolithic culture was destroyed by an earthquake c. 3800 BC. Despite the violent natural catastrophe there are signs of continuit with an internal evolution that is formalised around 3500 BC with appearance of the first metalwork and the beginning of the Chalcolithic (copper and stone) period that lasted until around 2500/2300 BC. Very few chisels, hooks and jewellery of pure copper have survived, but in one example there is a minimal presence of tin, something which may support contact with Asia Minor, where copper-working was established earlier.

During the Chalcolithic period changes of major importance took place along with technological and artistic achievements, especially towards its end. The presence of a stamp seal and non uniform house size, both hint at property rights and social hierarchy. This is supported by burials as some were deposited in pits without grave goods and some in shaft graves with relatively rich furniture, both indications of wealth accumulation by certain families and social differentiation.

The Eneolithic or Chalcolithic period is divided into the Erimi (Chalcolithic I) and Ambelikou/Ayios Georghios (Chalcolithic II) phases. The type site of the Neolithic I period is Erimi on the south coast of the island. The ceramic is characterised by red-on white pottery with linear and floral designs. Stone (steatite) and clay figurines with spread arms are common. In Erimi, a copper chisel has been found, this is the oldest copper find in Cyprus so far. Otherwise, copper is still rare. Another important Chalcolithic site is Lempa (Lemba).

== Bronze Age ==
=== Early Bronze Age ===
The new era was introduced by people from Anatolia who came to Cyprus around 2400 BC. The newcomers are identified archaeologically because of a distinct material culture, known as the Philia Culture. This was the earliest manifestation of the Bronze Age. Philia sites are found in most parts of the island.

As the newcomers knew how to work with copper they soon moved to the so-called copperbelt of the island, that is the foothills of the Troodos Mountains. This movement reflects the increased interest in the raw material that was going to be so closely connected with Cyprus for several centuries afterwards.

The Philia phase of the Bronze Age (or Philia phases) saw a rapid transformation of technology and economy. Rectilinear buildings made of mud-brick, the plough, the warp-weighted loom and clay pot stands are among the characteristic introductions. Cattle were reintroduced, together with the donkey.

The succeeding Early Bronze Age is divided into three general phases (Early Cypriot I–III) - a continuous process of development and population increase. Marki Alonia is the best excavated settlement of this period.

Marki Alonia and Sotira Kaminoudhia are excavated settlements. Many cemeteries are known, including Bellapais Vounous on the north coast.

=== Middle Bronze Age ===
The Middle Bronze Age, which follows the Early Bronze Age (1900–1600 BC), is a relatively short period and its earlier part is marked by peaceful development. The Middle Bronze Age is known from several excavated settlements: Marki Alonia, Alambra Mouttes and Pyrgos Mavroraki. These give evidence of the economy and architecture of the period. From Alambra and Marki in central Cyprus we know that the houses were rectangular with many rooms, with lanes allowing people to move freely in the community. At the end of the Middle Bronze Age, fortresses were built in various places, an indication of unrest, although the cause is uncertain. The most important cemeteries are at Bellapais, Lapithos, Kalavasos and Deneia. An extensive collection of Bronze Age pottery can be seen online from the cemeteries at Deneia.

The oldest copper workshops have been excavated at Pyrgos-Mavroraki, 90 km (56 mi) southwest of Nicosia. Cyprus was known as Alashiya, the name is preserved in Egyptian, Hittite, Assyrian and Ugaritic documents. The first recorded name of a Cypriot king is Kushmeshusha, as appears on letters sent to Ugarit in the 13th century BC.

=== Late Bronze Age ===
The beginning of the Late Bronze Age does not differ from the closing years of previous period. Unrest, tension and anxiety mark all these years, probably because of some sort of engagement with the Hyksos, who ruled Egypt at this time but were expelled from there in the mid-1500s BC. Soon afterwards peaceful conditions prevailed in the Eastern Mediterranean which saw a flowering of trade relations and the growing of urban centres. Chief among them was Enkomi, near modern Famagusta, though several other harbour towns also sprang up along the southern coast of Cyprus. Around 1500 BC, Thutmose III claimed Cyprus and imposed a tax on the island.

Literacy was introduced to Cyprus with the Cypro-Minoan syllabary, a derivation from Cretan Linear A. It was first used in early phases of the late Bronze Age (LCIB, 14th century BC) and continued in use for around 400 years into the LC IIIB, maybe up to the second half of the 11th century BC. It likely evolved into the Cypriot syllabary.

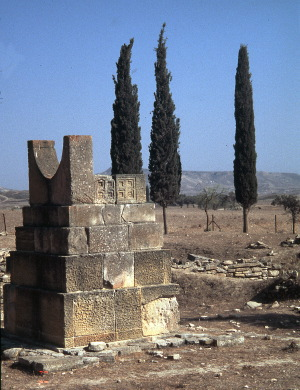
Late Bronze Age horned altar at Pigadhes

The Late Cypriot (LC) IIC (1300–1200 BC) was a time of local prosperity. Cities were rebuilt on a rectangular grid plan, like Enkomi, where the town gates now correspond to the grid axes and numerous grand buildings front the street system or newly founded. Great official buildings (constructed from ashlar-masonry) point to increased social hierarchisation and control. Some of these buildings contain facilities for processing and storing olive oil, like at Maroni-Vournes and "building X" at Kalavassos-Ayios Dhimitrios. Other ashlar-buildings are known from Palaeokastro. A Sanctuary with a horned altar constructed from ashlar-masonry has been found at Myrtou-Pigadhes, other temples have been located at Enkomi, Kition and Palaepaphos.

Rectangular corbelled tombs point to close contact with Syria and Canaan (probably around the emergence of ancient Israelites) as well. The practice of writing spread, and tablets in the Cypro-Minoan script have been found on the mainland as well (Ras Shamra). Ugaritic texts from Ras Shamra and Enkomi mention "Ya", the Assyrian name of Cyprus, that thus seems to have been in use already in the late Bronze Age.

Cyprus was, at some times, a part of the Hittite empire but was a client state and as such was not invaded but rather part of the empire by association and governed by the ruling kings of Ugarit. As such Cyprus was essentially "left alone with little intervention in Cypriot affairs". However, during the reign of Tudhaliya IV the island was briefly invaded by the Hittites to either secure the island's copper or as a way of preventing piracy. Shortly afterwards the island had to be reconquered again by his son Suppiluliuma II, around 1200 BC. Some towns (Enkomi, Kition, Palaeokastro and Sinda) show traces of destruction at the end of LC IIC. Originally, two waves of destruction, c. 1230 BC by the Sea Peoples and 1190 BC by Aegean refugees, or according to Paul Aström 1190 and 1179 BC, had been proposed. Some smaller settlements (Ayios Dhimitrios and Kokkinokremnos) were abandoned but do not show traces of destruction.

Rich finds from this period testify to vivid commerce with other countries. These include jewellery and other precious objects from the Aegean along with pottery that prove a close connections between the two areas, though finds coming from Near Eastern countries are also plentiful.

In the later phase of the late Bronze Age (LCIIIA, 1200–1100 BC) great amounts of "Mycenaean" IIIC:1b pottery were produced locally. New architectural features include Cyclopean walls, found on the Greek mainland as well and a certain type of rectangular stepped capitals, endemic to Cyprus. Chamber tombs are given up in favour of shaft graves. Cyprus was settled by Mycenaean Greeks by the end of the Bronze Age, beginning the Hellenization of the island. Large amounts of IIIC:1b pottery are found in Palestine during this period as well. There are finds that show close connections to Egypt as well. Egyptian pottery has been found at Hala Sultan Tekke, among them wine jugs bearing the cartouche of Seti I and fish bones of the Nile perch.

Another wave of Greek colonization is believed to have taken place in the following century (LCIIIB, 1100–1050), indicated, among other things, by a new type of graves (long dromoi) and Mycenean influences in pottery decoration.

Most authors claim that the Cypriot city kingdoms, first described in written sources in the 8th century BC were already founded in the 11th century BC. Other scholars see a slow process of increasing social complexity between the 12th and the 8th centuries, based on a network of chiefdoms. In the 8th century (geometric period) the number of settlements increases sharply and monumental tombs, like the 'Royal' tombs of Salamis appear for the first time. This could be a better indication for the appearance of the Cypriot kingdoms. This period shows the appearance of large urban centers.

== Iron Age ==
The Iron Age follows the Submycenean period (1125–1050 BC) or Late Bronze Age and is divided into the:

- Geometric 1050–700 BC
- Archaic 700–525 BC

In the ensuing Early Iron Age Cyprus becomes predominantly Greek. Pottery shapes and decoration show a marked Aegean inspiration although Oriental ideas creep in from time to time. Pottery types also appear from other Mediterranean cultures as evidenced from the recovery on Cyprus of pottery from Cydonia, a powerful urban center of ancient Crete. New burial customs with rock-cut chamber tombs having a long "dromos" (a ramp leading gradually towards the entrance) along with new religious beliefs speak in favour of the arrival of people from the Aegean. The same view is supported by the introduction of the safety pin that denotes a new fashion in dressing and also by a name scratched on a bronze skewer from Paphos and dating between 1050 and 950 BC.

Foundations myths documented by classical authors connect the foundation of numerous Cypriot towns with immigrant Greek heroes in the wake of the Trojan War. For example, Teucer, the brother of Aias was supposed to have founded Salamis, and the Arcadian Agapenor of Tegea to have replaced the native ruler Kinyras and to have founded Paphos. Some scholars see this as a memory of Greek colonisation already in the 11th century. In the 11th-century tomb 49 from Palaepaphos-Skales three bronze obeloi with inscriptions in Cypriot syllabic script have been found, one of which bears the name of Opheltas. This is the first indication of Greek language use on the island, although it is written in the Cypriot syllabary that remained in use until the 3rd century BC.

Cremation as a burial rite is seen as a Greek introduction as well. The first cremation burial in Bronze vessels has been found at Kourion-Kaloriziki, tomb 40, dated to the first half of the 11th century (LCIIIB). The shaft grave contained two bronze rod tripod stands, the remains of a shield, and a golden sceptre. Formerly seen as the royal grave of first Argive founders of Kourion, it is now interpreted as the tomb of a native Cypriote or a Phoenician prince. The cloisonné enamelling of the sceptre head with the two falcons surmounting it has no parallels in the Aegean, but shows a strong Egyptian influence.

In the 8th century, numerous Phoenician colonies were founded, like Kart-Hadasht ('New Town'), present day Larnaca and Salamis. The oldest cemetery of Salamis has indeed produced children's burials in Canaanite jars, clear indication of Phoenician presence already in the LCIIIB (11th century). Similar jar burials have been found in cemeteries in Kourion-Kaloriziki and Palaepaphos-Skales near Kouklia. In Skales, many Levantine imports and Cypriote imitations of Levantine forms have been found and point to a Phoenician expansion even before the end of the 11th century.

The 8th century BC saw a marked increase of wealth in Cyprus. Communications to the east and west were on the ascent and this created a prosperous society. Testifying to this wealth are the so-called royal tombs of Salamis, which, although plundered, produced a large abundance of wealth. Sacrifices of horses, bronze tripods and huge cauldrons decorated with sirens, griffins etc., chariots with all their ornamentation and the horses' gear, ivory beds and thrones exquisitely decorated were all deposited into the tombs' "dromoi" for the sake of their masters.

The late 8th century saw the spreading of the Iliad and the Odyssey. Funerary customs at Salamis and elsewhere were greatly influenced by these poems. The deceased were given skewers and firelogs in order to roast their meat, a practice found in contemporary Argos and Crete, recalling the similar gear of Achilles when he entertained other Greek heroes in his tent. Honey and oil, described by Homer as offerings to the dead are also found at Salamis, and the flames of fire that consumed the deceased were quenched with wine as it happened to Patroclus' body after it was given to the flames. As described by Homer for the funeral of Patroclus, the hero's ashes were gathered carefully and placed into a golden urn, which was then covered with a soft linen cloth.

At Salamis, the remains of a thin cloth containing or covering burned human remains were identified in a bronze vessel in Tomb 1.

The Prehistoric Period came to an end with the writing of the first works that still survive, first by the Assyrians, then by Greeks and Romans.

== Genetic studies ==
=== Neolithic Cyprus ===
In their archaeogenetics study, Lazaridis et al. (2022) carried out principal components analysis (PCA), projecting the ancient individuals onto the variation of present-day West Eurasians. They discovered that Neolithic Cypriots genetically clustered with Neolithic Anatolians. Two main clusters emerge: an “Eastern Mediterranean” Anatolian/Levantine cluster that also includes the geographically intermediate individuals from Cyprus, and an "inland" Zagros-Caucasus-Mesopotamia-Armenia-Azerbaijan cluster. There is structure within these groupings. Anatolian individuals group with each other and with those from Cyprus, whereas Levantine individuals are distinct.

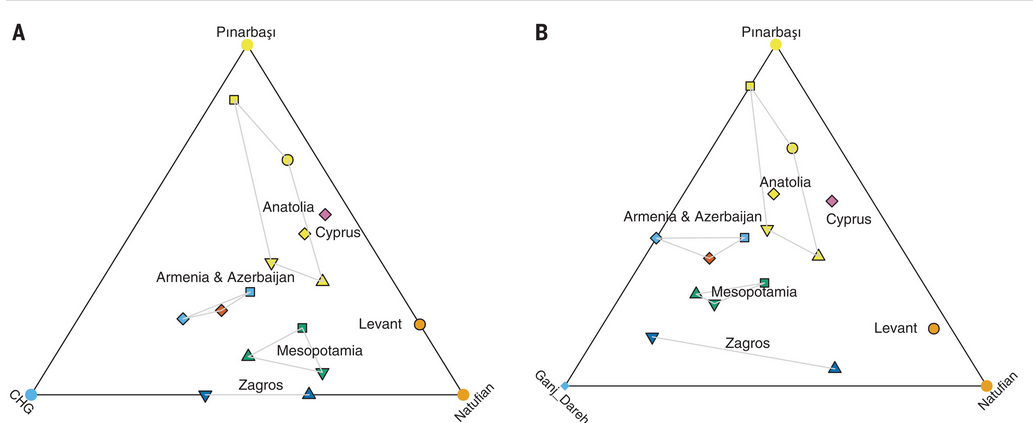
Three-way admixture model of Neolithic populations. Pinarbasi = Anatolian Hunter Gatherer Ganj_Dareh = Iran Neolithic Farmer CHG = Caucasus Hunter Gatherer

During the Neolithic era the highest proportion of Anatolian Neolithic-related ancestry is observed in Neolithic Anatolian populations as well as Neolithic Aegeans and the early farmers of Cyprus. The high Anatolian-related ancestry in Cyprus revealed by their model and subsequent analyses sheds light on debates about the origins of the people who spread Pre-Pottery Neolithic culture to Cyprus. Parallels in subsistence, technology, settlement organization, and ideological indicators suggest close contacts between Pre-Pottery Neolithic B people in Cyprus and on the mainland, but the geographic source of the Cypriot Pre-Pottery Neolithic populations has been unclear, with many possible points of origin. An inland Middle Euphrates source has been suggested on the basis of architectural and artifactual similarities. However, the faunal record at Cypriot Pre-Pottery Neolithic B sites and the use of Anatolian obsidian as raw material suggest linkages with Central and Southern Anatolia, and the genetic data increase the weight of evidence in favor of this scenario of a primary source in Anatolia.

== See also ==
- Cyprus dwarf elephant
- Cyprus dwarf hippopotamus
