= Shillourokambos =

Archaeological site

Shillourokambos (Greek: Σιλλουρόκαμπος) is a Pre-Pottery Neolithic B (PPNB) site near Parekklisia, 6 km (3.7 mi) east of Limassol in southern Cyprus. It is located on a low plateau. Excavations began in 1992. The settlement has four phases and was occupied from the end of the 9th millennium to the second half of the 8th millennium.

The architecture of phases A and B (8200–7500 BC, calibrated) is characterised by circular wattle and daub structures, with post holes cut into the bedrock. Some deep pits may have served as wells.

Around 300 blades of Anatolian obsidian point to trade connections with the mainland. Sickles are made of multiple parts, and projectile points made of bipolar blades, lacking in the later Khirokitia culture, are common. The site contains wells and cattle enclosures as well. The middle and late phases (7500 BC) conform more closely to the Khirokitia culture with circular stone houses, comparable to those at Kastros. Imported obsidian is rare, and sickles are made from single robust blades.

The site is important because it attests to the presence of cattle in the aceramic Neolithic period. Cattle died out in the course of the 8th millennium and were not reintroduced until the ceramic Neolithic. Only dog and pig bones show morphological signs of domestication (size reduction), sheep, goat and cattle bones are in the size range of the wild species (Mouflon, bezoar ibex and wild cattle, respectively). The range of bones present point to a killing near the site, thus making a state of pre-domestication probable. Fox and Persian fallow deer are present as well, but seem to have been hunted. There are no bones of the Holocene dwarf fauna present in Shillourokambos.

Shillourokambos is also the site where the oldest evidence of human domestication of cats was found. Historians previously accounted Egypt as the earliest site of cat domestication due to the clear depictions of house cats in ancient Egyptian paintings from about 3,600 years ago. However, in 2004, a Neolithic grave was excavated in Shillourokambos that contained skeletons, of both a human and a cat, laid close together. The grave is estimated to be 9,500 years old, pushing back the earliest known feline-human association significantly. The cat specimen is large and closely resembles the African wildcat, rather than present-day domestic cats.

Until recently the cat was commonly believed to have been domesticated in ancient Egypt, where it was a cult animal. But three years ago a group of French archaeologists led by Jean-Denis Vigne discovered the remains of an 8-month-old cat buried with its human owner at a Neolithic site in Cyprus. The date of the burial far precedes Egyptian civilization. Together with the new genetic evidence, it places the domestication of the cat in a different context.

— Wade, Nicholas, The New York Times, 2007

== Sources ==
- Jean Guilaine/Francois Briois, Parekklisha Shillourokambos: an early Neolithic site in Cyprus. In: S. Swiny (ed.), The earliest prehistory of Cyprus. From Colonization to exploitation American archaeological research institute Monograph Series 2 (Boston American School of oriental research 2001), 37–54.
- Vigne J.-D., Carrère I., Briois F. and Guilaine J., 2011. The Early Process of the Mammal Domestication in the Near East: New Evidence from the Pre-Neolithic and Pre-Pottery Neolithic in Cyprus. Current Anthropology, S52, 4: S255-S271
