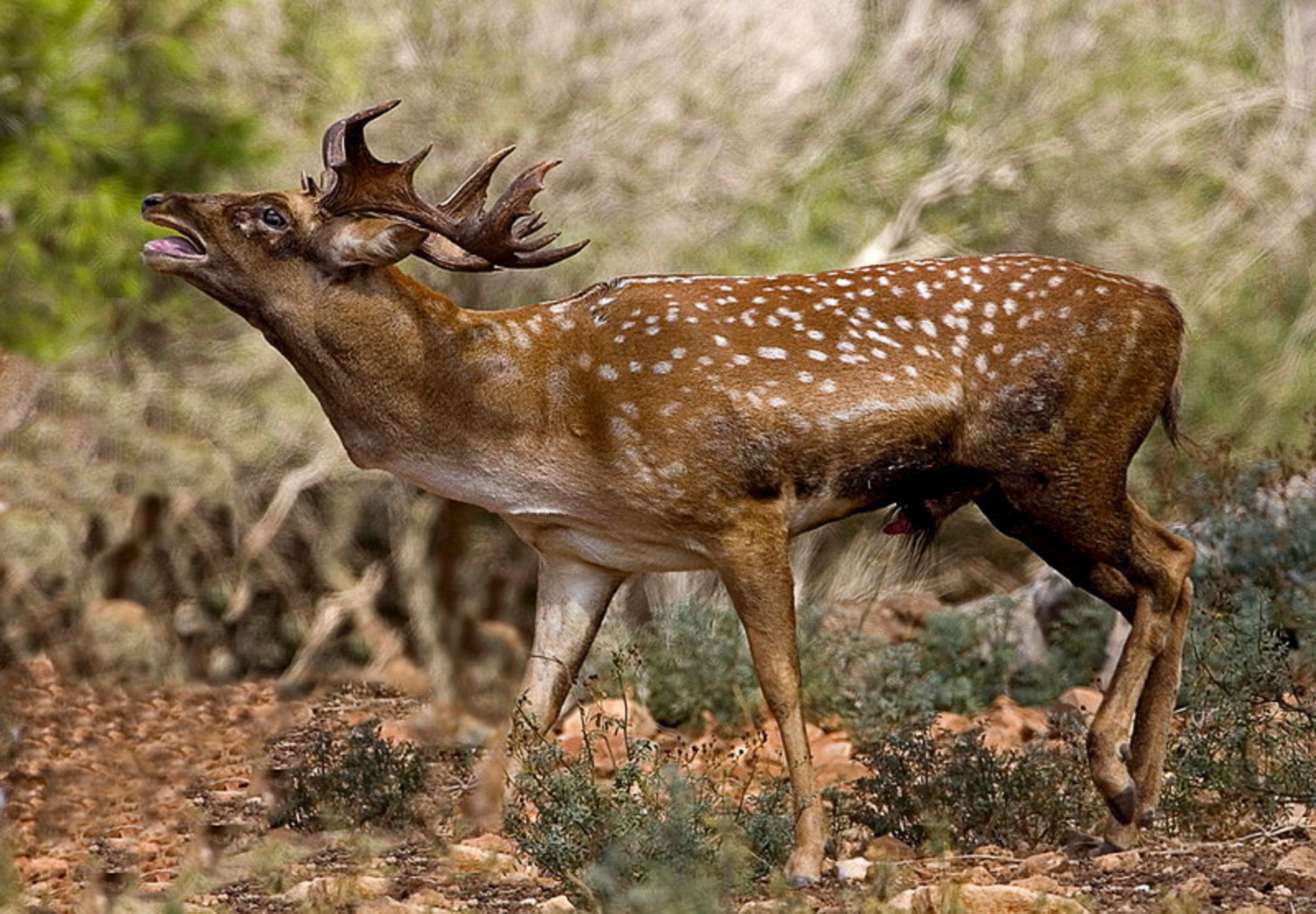
- A Persian fallow deer buck at Carmel Hai-Bar Nature Reserve in Israel, 2007

Conservation status
- Endangered (IUCN 3.1)
- CITES Appendix I

Scientific classification
- Kingdom: Animalia
- Phylum: Chordata
- Class: Mammalia
- Infraclass: Placentalia
- Order: Artiodactyla
- Family: Cervidae
- Genus: Dama
- Species: D. mesopotamica

Binomial name
- Dama mesopotamica (Brooke, 1875)
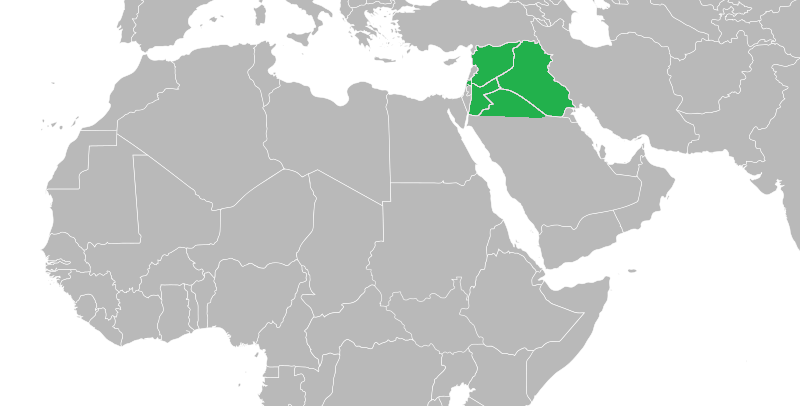
- Distribution (est.) of the Persian fallow deer species in the 19th century

Synonyms
- Dama dama mesopotamica

= Persian fallow deer =

Species of deer

The Persian fallow deer (Dama mesopotamica) is a species of deer that once inhabited most of West Asia, but is currently only found in the wild in Iran and Israel. Since 2008, it has been classified as an endangered species on the IUCN Red List. Owing to a focused program of captive breeding, the population of Persian fallow deer has rebounded from only a handful of deer in the 1960s to over a thousand deer in the 2010s. The species was re-introduced to Israel in 1978, thereafter reaching a stable wild population there, while it continues to occur naturally in Iran. There are smaller populations of Persian fallow deer in captivity at European zoos, particularly in Germany.

== Taxonomy ==
Cervus (Dama) mesopotamicus was described by Victor Brooke in 1875 for a deer that was shot at the Karun river in Iran.

Its taxonomic status is disputed. It has traditionally been considered to be a subspecies of the fallow deer from western Europe, Dama dama (as Dama dama mesopotamica), but is also treated as a distinct species by some authors.

== Description ==
Persian fallow deer have an average body mass of around 70–140 kilograms (150–310 lb), considerably larger than European fallow deer. They reach a shoulder height of around 80–110 centimetres (31–43 in) and a length of 130–240 centimetres (51–94 in). Their palmate (flattened) antlers are somewhat less broad than those of European fallow deer. Other differences include the colour of the tail and having a wider upper end of the nasal bones than European fallow deer.

== Distribution and habitat ==
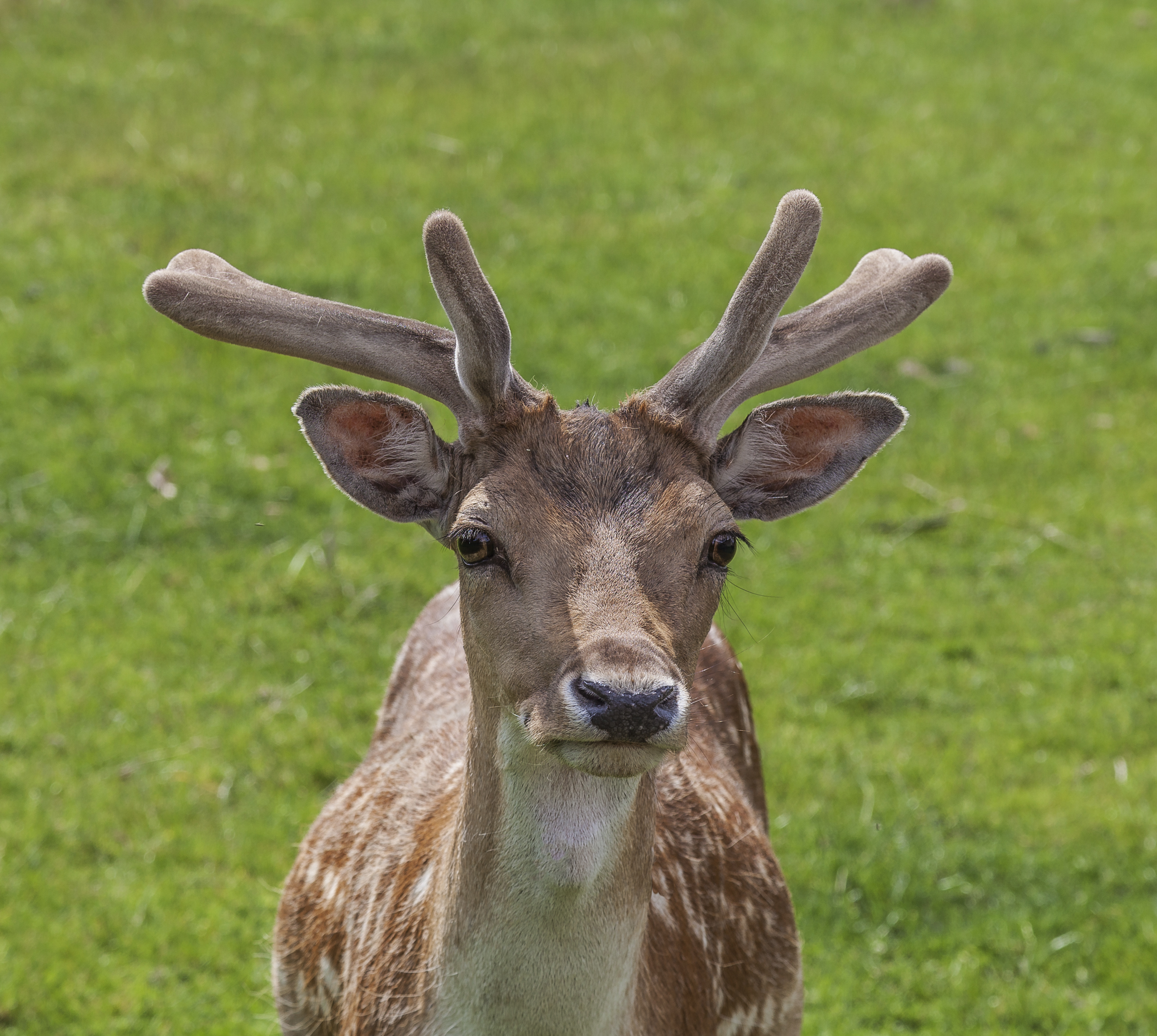
Persian fallow deer buck in Geinsheim, Rhineland-Palatinate, Germany, 2021

The Persian fallow deer prefers woodlands of tamarisk, oak and pistachio. It avoids roads, even when traffic is low, which limits its spread and movement.

=== Historic ===
Before the Neolithic era, as humans first began to colonise Europe, Persian fallow deer were found in Mesopotamia, the Levant, and Anatolia. The Anatolian population appear to have co-existed with the normal fallow deer, which still survives there today. They interbred with it freely to form intermediate populations. There is a suggestion that they may have been imported into Egypt as a menagerie animal during the time of the pharaohs. Some writers believe that the deer might have occurred throughout the Middle East in the 16th or 17th century.

The range of the deer has fluctuated between the millennia. During the Natufian period in modern-day Israel, some 15,000 to 9,500 years ago, studies in zooarcheology have shown the fallow deer became extinct in southern Israel, while gazelle and especially roe deer proliferated. This is thought to be due to climate change in combination with changing land-use patterns and hunting pressure. At the same time the taxon persisted in the north in the Galilee region. During the early Iron Age, fallow deer were an important species sacrificed at the altar on Mount Ebal near the northern West Bank city of Nablus, comprising 10% of the faunal assemblage (many species were sacrificed). Pleistocene fallow deer of the region were larger, extant populations have evolved into smaller animals.

They were introduced to Cyprus by humans some 10,000 years ago, in the pre-pottery Neolithic (Cypro-PPNB), and expanded rapidly as the indigenous megafauna of the island became extinct, such as the endemic dwarf elephant and dwarf hippo species. Despite having cows, sheep, goats, pigs, dogs and cats, it is thought the prehistoric Cypriots managed the deer herds in some way for the next millennia, or may even have domesticated the animal. For six thousand years the deer were one of the main sources of meat for the islands, in marked contrast to the rest of the world; from 7,000 to 4,500 years ago the deer appear to have become possibly the most important economic mainstay of the island, with deer bones amounting to 70% of the animal remains at some sites. They occurred in significant numbers at the aceramic Neolithic sites of throughout Cyprus, such as Khirokitia, Kalavasos-Tenta, Cap Andreas Kastros, and Ais Yiorkis, and were important through the Cypriot Bronze Age. The deer were finally extirpated from the island in the 15th century.

In the Book of Deuteronomy 14:5, the yaḥmur (Hebrew: יַחְמ֑וּר, romanized: yaḥmûr) is listed as the third species of animal that may be eaten. This word has usually been translated as "roe", but in the King James Version it was translated as "fallow deer", and many more species have been named.

=== Modern ===
Persian fallow deer in Mazandaran, Iran, 2008

Currently, the Persian fallow deer occurs only in Iran and Israel. In 1978, Israeli conservationists carried some of the captive fallow deer out of Iran and to Israel for safekeeping in Carmel Hai-Bar Nature Reserve and Jerusalem Biblical Zoo. Since 1996, some have been gradually and successfully reintroduced into the wild, and as of 2020 live in the western Galilee, Mount Carmel areas, Mount Sasa and the Judean Hills.

By 1998, the population of Persian fallow deer had become well established in Israel and was gradually growing in number in a number of protected parks and zoos.

== Behaviour and ecology ==
The Persian fallow deer is a grazing herbivore, with grass comprising 60% of its diet along with leaves and nuts. Persian fallow deer home range sizes vary based on gender and age. Older male deer are more territorial than younger males; however, older females stay closer to the site within an average of 0.9 km (0.56 mi) where they were reintroduced, while younger females migrate an average of 2.3 km (1.4 mi) away from release site. Pregnancy lasts around 230 days, with females continuing to breed until around 15 years of age. The maximum lifespan is around 20 years.

It lives at least until eleven years old in the wild. A natural predator of the deer is the grey wolf. Spotted hyenas also heavily preyed upon Persian fallow deer during the Late Pleistocene, before their disappearance from the Middle East.

== Threats ==
It is thought that the main reason for the decline of Persian fallow deer has been human hunting, beginning since the early Neolithic era. Interspecific competition with domestic livestock, human encroachment and habitat destruction for agriculture may also have contributed to their lowered numbers, as only around 10% of their former range still exists for habitation. Hunters are thought to have shot an animal in the 1990s, and feral packs of dogs have been known to kill deer in Israel. The current (and historical) top cause of mortality, as with many deer species worldwide, is collisions with trains or cars—which is also a considerable danger to human drivers, with some people being killed in traffic accidents involving especially large deer. As the native wolf population of Israel has recovered and recolonised areas of the country from the Golan Heights, wolf predation of fallow deer has increased steadily since the late 2010s, something authorities have tried to curb somewhat. Historically, when their numbers were higher, Anatolian leopards and Syrian brown bears may have been predators of Persian fallow deer.

== Conservation ==
Although 1,100 individuals as of 2015 means that the taxon no longer qualifies as 'endangered', the IUCN argues that only wild and mature animals in Israel count (300), and subtracts 50 from this number because it claims they may not be viably mature, and thus is still able to claim less than 250 animals exist, which then makes the taxon eligible for criterion D of the IUCN conservation status standards for 'endangered'. This is the opposite of the situation a few years earlier, when the IUCN claimed that because there was a possibility that the Israeli population may have somehow become hybridised with European fallow deer, only the population in Iran should count as 'Persian fallow deer', and was thereby able to claim the species met the requirements for criterion D and could be called 'endangered'. Research in 2012 showed there was no signs of admixture or hybridization in any of the deer in Europe, Iran or Israel. Numbers are increasing rapidly in all populations.

=== In captivity ===
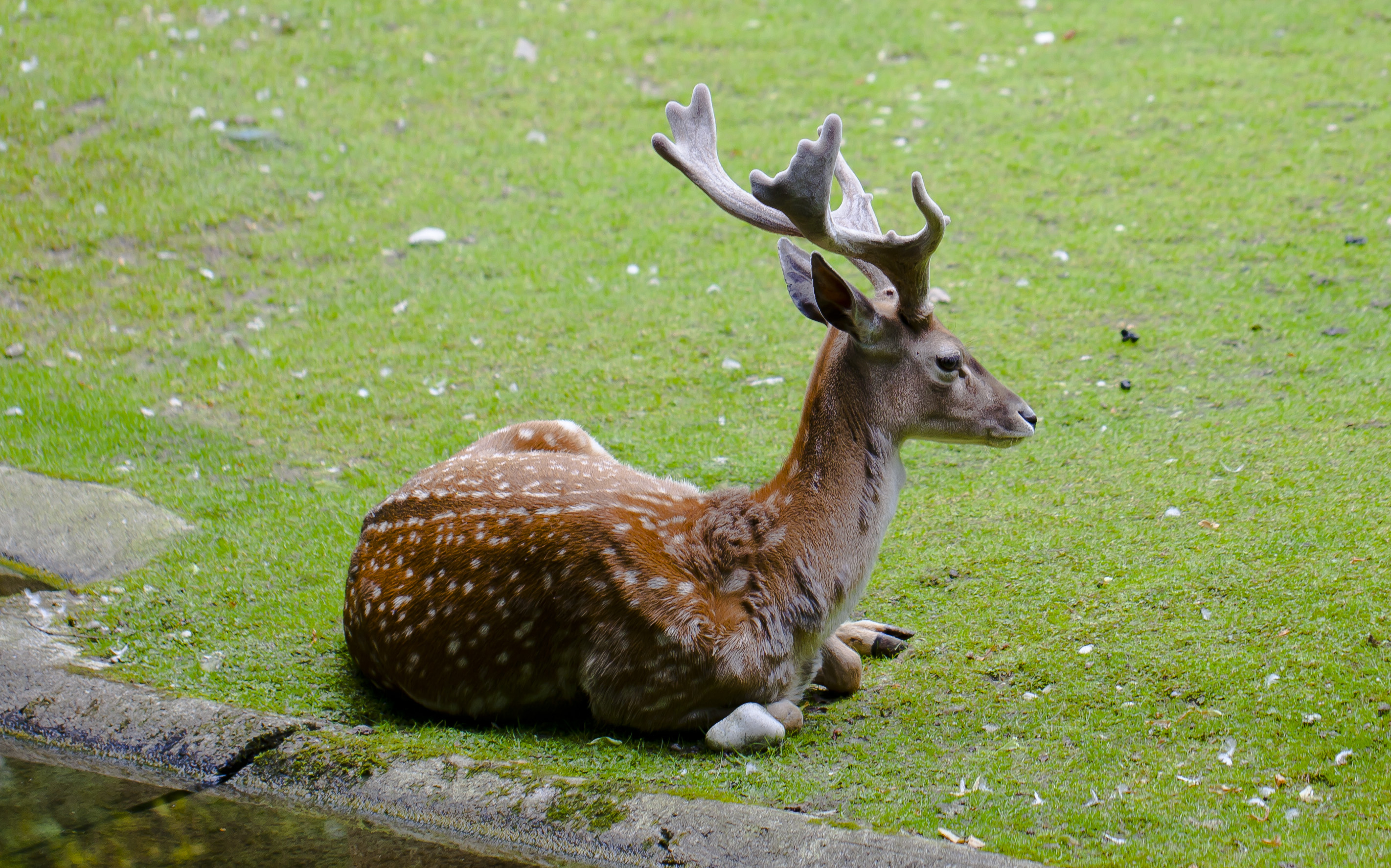
Persian fallow deer buck at Hellabrunn Zoo in Munich, Germany, 2012

In 1875, when the species was first scientifically discovered, its range was restricted to southwestern and western Iran. A herd was kept in Britain in the 19th century. The taxon was thought to be extinct again by the 1940s, but was subsequently rediscovered in the Khuzestan Province in southwestern Iran in 1956. The Iranian Game and Fish Department quickly took actions to help conserve the Persian fallow deer by designating the Dez Wildlife Refuge and Karkeh Wildlife Refuge around the site of this animal's rediscovery, where indigenous populations are still conserved.

In 1957–1958, a wild pair of pure-blood fawns was captured and brought to the Opel Zoo in Germany, where the wild female gave birth to its first pure-blood captive female in 1960; however, the male partner did not survive long enough to produce a second fawn. Without a male, a number of hybrids with the European fallow deer were born in Opel Zoo, all seven of these were sent to Dasht-e Naz back in Iran in 1973.

From 1964 to 1967, the Iranian Game and Fish Department sent three expeditions to the Kareheh (old/new/different name for Karkeh?) area near the rediscovery site, during which three males and three females were captured, of which one male was sent to Germany, and the others used to initiate the Iranian breeding program at Dasht-e Naz Wildlife Refuge. The Iranian program was successful, and by the 1970s the taxon had been transferred to Ashk Island (in Lake Urmia), Arjan Protected Area (in the Zagros Mountains), Semeskandeh Wildlife Refuge and Kareheh Wildlife Refuge. By 1989 the deer were found in seven Iranian nature parks: Dez, Karcheh/Karkeh, Bachtaran, Ashk Island, Kabuldagh Island, Dasht-e Naz and Semeskandeh. The Semeskandeh population was derived from deer that Germany returned to Iran during the early 1970s. Iran immediately removed the hybrids from their breeding stock at Dasht-e Naz to Semeskandeh. In 1989 there were 169 to 194 known deer in Iran, with an unknown number in the wild in the original areas. The largest population, 50 to 70 animals, was at Dasht-e Naz. The smallest was at Kabuldagh Island, where six deer had been transferred in 1989. The population had increased to just under 250 by the 1990s. In 2003 there were 211 deer on Askh Island, 28 at Dasht-e Naz, and an unknown number at at least six other parks. By 2004, the total Iranian population had increased to approximately 340 individuals. As of 2013 the known Iranian population totalled 371 individuals across 14 sites, with 213 animals on Askh.

The reintroduction of fallow deer to Israel was due to an initiative by the Israel Nature and Parks Authority to restore biblically named mammals that had been lost. The initial breeding program with three pure-blood Persian fallow deer from the Opel Zoo in 1976, with an additional four deer translocated from Semeshkandeh reserve in Iran in a raid-like caper in 1978, which were taken to a breeding enclosure in the Carmel Hai-Bar Nature Reserve. After a successful breeding program, many hundreds of deer have been derived from this original stock. It was later feared that the animals taken by Israel from Semeskandeh consisted of hybrids. Later genetic research showed that Iran had never mixed the stocks.

Currently, several native and reintroduced populations are in numerous wildlife refuges in Iran and Israel. As a result of conservation efforts thus far, as of 2015, the current world population of the Persian fallow deer is estimated to be over 1,100 individuals, with just over half in Israel: there were 300 specimens living in the wild and 270 in captivity in Israel. Although the genetic diversity is low as the result of inbreeding, this does not appear to have caused any problems. There is also a population of hybrids with the nominate subspecies of fallow deer extant in Iran. As of 2020 Israel Nature and Parks Authority estimates that some 200 to 300 live in the wild in the northern Galilee area, between 90 and 100 in the Judean Hills and somewhat lower numbers on Mount Carmel. Releases of captive-bred animals is still ongoing and more are planned for 2021. The species is clearly spreading, with sighting, droppings and camera traps showing a steady increase in population and a spread in distribution to the east.

The European zoo population clearly shows a lower allelic diversity than the Israeli population, and both these populations are less genomically diverse than the wild Iranian stock, which has about the same genetic diversity as the nominate Dama dama from Europe. Genetic variation is a concern in small populations because of an effect known as inbreeding depression, where deleterious genetic diseases build up and the fecundity of the population drops. In Israel the population does not appear to suffer from any of these small population size effects.

The captive population in Australia and New Zealand are hybrids created by importing sperm from Mesopotamian bucks and artificially inseminating normal fallow does. By repeatedly crossing the offspring with the original sperm, later generations have acquired an almost Mesopotamian genome and phenotype.

=== Reintroduction ===
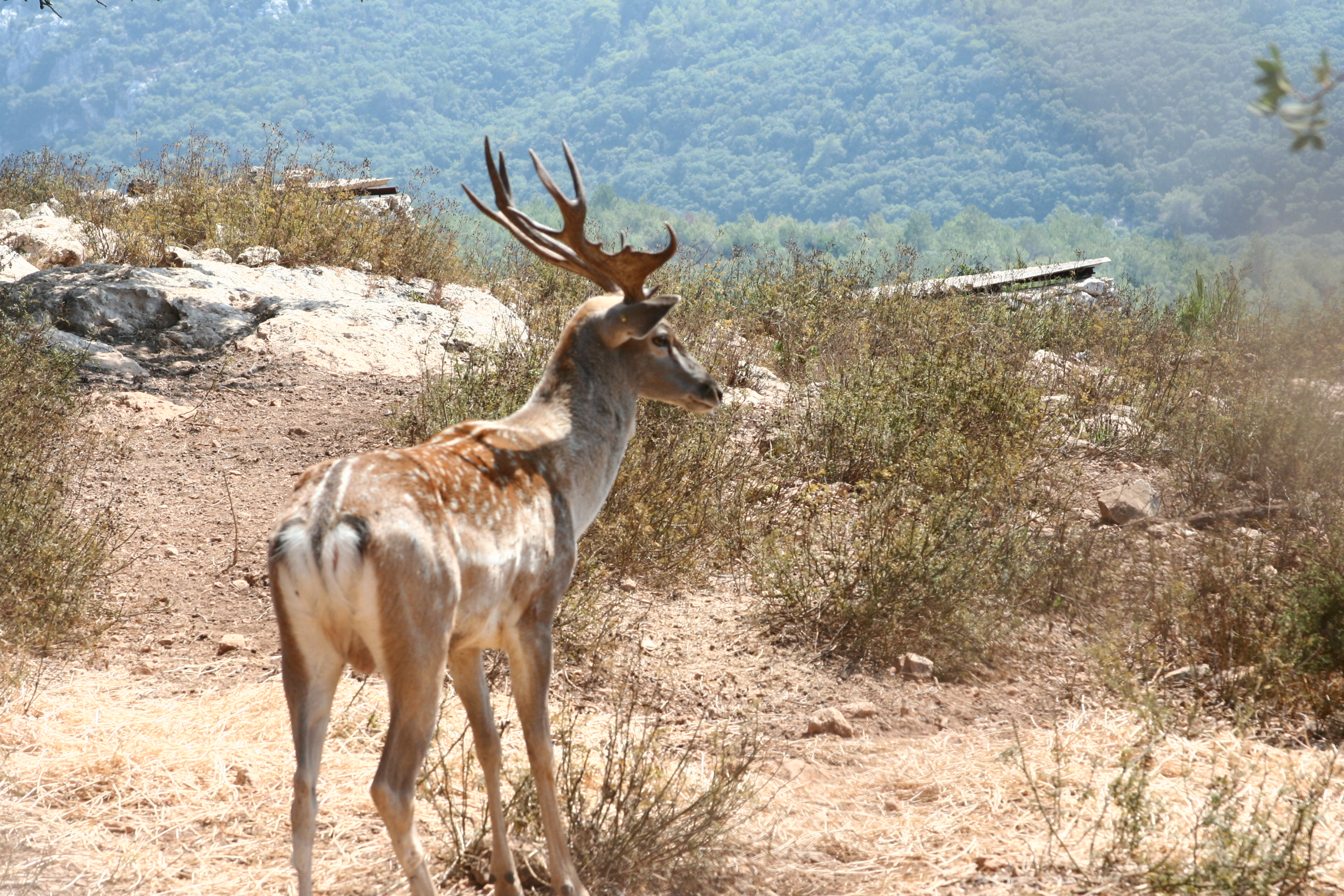
Persian fallow deer in Israel, 2008

In 1996, after breeding a stock 150 animals, Israel's Nature Reserves Authority began reintroducing the deer in the wild. A dozen deer were transferred every six months or so to an enclosed acclimatization area located in the reserve at Nahal Kziv in the Western Galilee. By early 2002, 120 deer had been reintroduced, and 40 new fawns had been born. After 2002 the reintroductions dropped to about six animals a year, a situation maintained as of 2020.

The maximum sustainable yield, the greatest number of individuals that can be removed from the breeding pool to maximize the reintroduced population's size while allowing the breeding core to recover between each reintroduction event, was calculated by Saltz, and the projected population growth after reintroduction was modelled. The removal of 28% of female deer from the breeding pool in the first year of reintroduction and then the removal of about 12 females during each subsequent year was deemed sufficient by him, while maintaining a breeding pool size of 250 deer. Overall recruitment after 3 years appears to be at least 30%. Recruitment in captive herd in Israel is some 78% over the period 1976 to 1996. Moreover, the survival of the reintroduced deer was high, having an 85% survival rate after reintroduction.

=== Survival ===
Persian fallow deer bred at the more busy Jerusalem Zoo were more likely to be killed, displayed less anti-predator behaviour, and spent more time in the open: all twelve released animals from this facility were dead within 200 days. The deer from the breeding facility at Mount Carmel had much more success, with the majority surviving. Deer that are more daring generally disperse further.

The first group of Persian fallow deer released into the wild displayed a slow, gradual movement away from the release site over relatively short distances and the establishment of regular movement patterns and a home range within 8 to 10 months. Subsequent releases indicated an establishment of a home range in less than one month. It was feared repeated releases from a single enclosure would impact the animals' natural ability to form a home range, but this proved unfounded, in fact the establishment of females released in later reintroduction events was potentially enhanced. Trends in survival rates of the reintroduced deer were compared to several different models predicting population survival patterns. The reintroduced population's survival best matched the model that assumed the chance of survival would only depend on an individual deer's time since release, which was statistically about three times more probable, on average, than the other models that were tested. Several possible causes exist for this reduction in survivorship soon after an individual is released into the wild, including the stress induced by releasing captive individuals into the wild and the reduced success of inexperienced mothers attempting to raise their first young in an unfamiliar habitat.

== See also ==
- Arzhan National Park
