= Carmel Hai-Bar Nature Reserve =

Zoo in the Carmel mountains, Israel

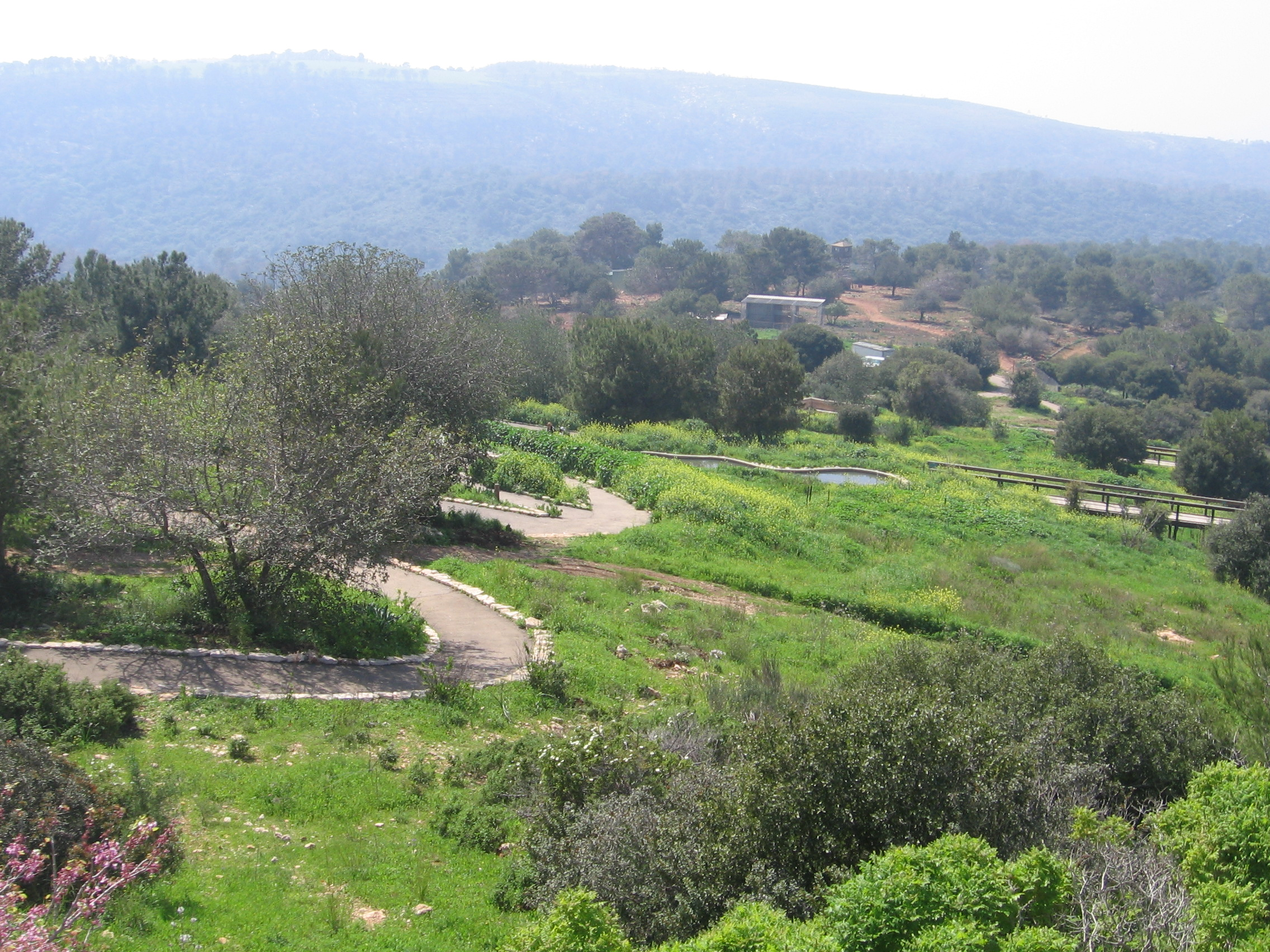
- Interactive map of Carmel Hai-Bar Nature Reserve
- 32.753°N 35.013°E
- Location: Carmel mountains, Northwestern Israel
- Land area: 1,500 acres (610 ha)
- Website: Preserve Website

Carmel Hai-Bar Nature Reserve (Hebrew: שמורת טבע חי בר בכרמל) is a 1,500-acre (610 ha) breeding and acclimation center administered by the Israel Nature Reserves and National Parks Authority, situated in the Carmel mountains in northwestern Israel, within the larger Mount Carmel National Park. The Carmel Hai-Bar is the Mediterranean climate counterpart of the Yotvata Hai-Bar Nature Reserve which operates in the desert. The University of Haifa is located next to the entrance to the park.

Endangered and locally extinct animals (which formerly lived in Israel) are bred here for possible reintroduction to the Mediterranean forest of northern Israel.

Some of the species bred here are:

- Griffon vulture (Gyps fulvus)
- Persian fallow deer (Dama mesopotamica)
- Mountain gazelle (Gazella gazella gazella)
- Roe deer (Capreolus capreolus coxi)
- White-tailed eagle (Haliaeetus albicilla)
- Fire salamander (Salamandra infraimmaculata)
- Wild goat (Capra aegagrus)
- Wild sheep (Ovis orientalis)
- Egyptian vulture (Neophron percnopterus)

Persian fallow deer, griffon vultures, Egyptian vultures, and roe deer have been successfully reintroduced into the wild from this facility. Formerly extinct in Israel, the Persian fallow deer now numbers approximately 300 in the wild. Research shows that Egyptian vultures bred in the Hai Bar reserve and released into the wild have similar survival rates to those born in the wild.

== The 2010 Fire and the Heroic Rescue Operation ==
During the devastating Mount Carmel forest fire in December 2010, the Carmel Hai-Bar Nature Reserve faced an immediate and existential threat that put its entire reintroduction project at risk, particularly the vulnerable Persian fallow deer population. As the massive wildfire surrounded the reserve, rangers and rescue teams bravely refused to evacuate the site, risking their lives to create fire barriers and protect the trapped animals. A complex rescue operation was quickly launched under heavy smoke to evacuate the animals, during which endangered raptors, wild sheep, wild goats were captured and rushed to safer locations. While some territorial fallow deer had to be released into the open forest to flee the flames on their own, the dedicated, round-the-clock efforts of the staff ultimately saved the vast majority of the reserve's rare wildlife from destruction.
