= Kastros =

Kastros is an early Neolithic settlement in Cyprus.

== Location ==
Kastros lies at the north-easternmost tip of the Karpas Peninsula (Cape Apostolos Andreas), about 4 km (2.5 mi) north of Apostolos Andreas Monastery. The settlement is situated on a little plateau at the steep flank of the limestone promontory, about halfway between the main plateau of the peninsula and the sea in a very inaccessible location.

== History of excavations ==
Between 1970 and 1973 three campaigns of excavations were conducted by a French team headed by Alain Le Brun. The excavation was interrupted by the 1974 Turkish invasion of Cyprus. Today, the structures remain open to the sky and are slowly eroding.

== Houses ==
The settlement consists of small round or roundish houses. Their diameter is between 2.5 and 2.8 m (8.2 and 9.2 ft), which gives a living surface of between 5 and 6.8 m^{2} (54 and 73 sq ft). The houses contain a hearth and sometimes container-bins in the floor. The walls are thin, composed of a single course of dry stone walling. Sometimes several of these are arranged around a common courtyard or stand on small platforms levelled into the hillside. Only one house has a more substantial wall (1.7 m (5.6 ft) thick) and the excavator thinks it might have had a different function to the rest of the structures.

== Other structures ==
There are some small pits filled with charcoal and burned stones. It is believed they may have been used to prepare food or smoke meat, in the manner of the Polynesian pit ovens or the Irish fulachtaí fia.

== Burials ==
One burial was discovered in a shallow trapezoidal pit measuring 0.75 by 0.45 m (2.5 by 1.5 ft). The body lay on the back, with flexed legs, the head to the northeast, the face turned to the southeast. This type of burial also known from Khirokitia (group II). The burial was situated outside near a house, in contrast to Khirokitia, were all burials are situated inside the houses. The grave contained four small shells with drilled holes and one dentalium shell.

== Dating ==
The site belongs to the aceramic Neolithic (PPN B) and dates to the 6th Millennium BC. There are three radiocarbon dates from the site (uncalibrated):

Lab-number	feature	date BP	deviation
MC-803	Pit 549	6410	200
MC-805	Occupation surface	7775	125
MC-803	Occupation surface	7450	120

== Finds ==
The houses contain querns. Further finds include stone-vessels (shallow bowls and pots) and flint tools made from local flint from the Pentadaktylos mountains.

== Economy ==
The carbonised remains of einkorn, emmer and some barley have been found. The relatively high proportion of rye-grass (Lolium sp.) has led van Zeist to suppose that it might not have been a weed, but grown as a crop. Among the pulses, lentils dominate, but peas, vetch and bitter vetch are represented as well. Wild pistachio, figs and olives, were also part of the diet.

== Sources ==
- A. Le Brun, Cap Andreas – Kastros (Chypre). "Quelques resultats de la campagne de 1973." Paléorient 3, 1975/77, 305–310.
- Julie Hansen, "Ancient Neolithic plant remains in Cyprus: Clues to their origins?" In: S. Swiny, The earliest prehistory of Cyprus. From Colonization to exploitation. Cyprus American archaeological research institute Monograph Series 2 (Boston American School of oriental research 2001), 119–128.
