= Aceramic =

Archaeological term for societies that did not produce pottery

Aceramic is defined as "not producing pottery". In archaeology, the term means "without pottery". Aceramic societies usually used bark, basketry, gourds and leather for containers.

"Aceramic" is used to describe a culture at any time prior to its development of pottery as well as cultures that lack pottery altogether. A preceramic period is traditionally regarded as occurring in the early stage of the Neolithic period of a culture, but recent findings in Japan and China have pushed the origin of ceramic technology there well back into the Paleolithic era.

== West Asia ==
In Western Asian archaeology, Aceramic is used to refer to a specific early Neolithic period before the development of ceramics, the Middle Eastern Pre-Pottery Neolithic, in which case it is a synonym of preceramic or pre-pottery.

The Western Asian Pre-Pottery Neolithic A began roughly around 8500 BC and can be identified with over a half a dozen sites. The period was most prominent in Western Asia in an economy based on the cultivation of crops or the rearing of animals or both. Outside Western Asia, Aceramic Neolithic groups are more rare. Aceramic Neolithic villages had many attributes of agricultural communities: large settlement size, substantial architecture, long settlement duration, intensive harvesting of seeds with sickles, equipment and facilities for storing and grinding seeds, and containers. Morphological evidence for domestication of plants comes only from Middle Pre-Pottery Neolithic B (PPNB), and by Late PPNB some animals, notably goats, were domesticated or at least managed in most of the sites.

=== Cyprus ===
Some of the most famous Aceramic sites are located in the Republic of Cyprus. There was an Early Aceramic Neolithic phase beginning around 8200 BC. The phase can be best thought of as a "colony", or initial settlement of the island. Until the relatively recent discoveries of the Akrotiri and the Early Aceramic Neolithic phases, the Aceramic Neolithic culture known as the Khirokitia culture was thought to be the earliest human settlement on Cyprus, from 7000 to 5000 BC. There are a number of Late Aceramic Neolithic sites throughout the island. The two most important sites are called Khirokitia and Kalavasos-Tenta. Late Aceramic Cyprus did not have much external contact because of a lack of settlement in the west or northwest during the period. However, Late Aceramic Cyprus was a well-structured society.

== Americas ==
The specific term "Pre-Ceramic" is used for a period in many chronologies of the archaeology of the Americas, typically showing some agriculture and developed textiles but no fired pottery. For example, in the Norte Chico civilization and other cultures of Peru, the cultivation of cotton seems to have been very important in economic and power relations, from around 3200 BC. Here, Cotton Pre-Ceramic may be used as a period. The Pre-Ceramic may be followed by "Ceramic" periods or a formative stage.

== See also ==
- Pre-Ceramic Maya
