= Domestication of the goat =

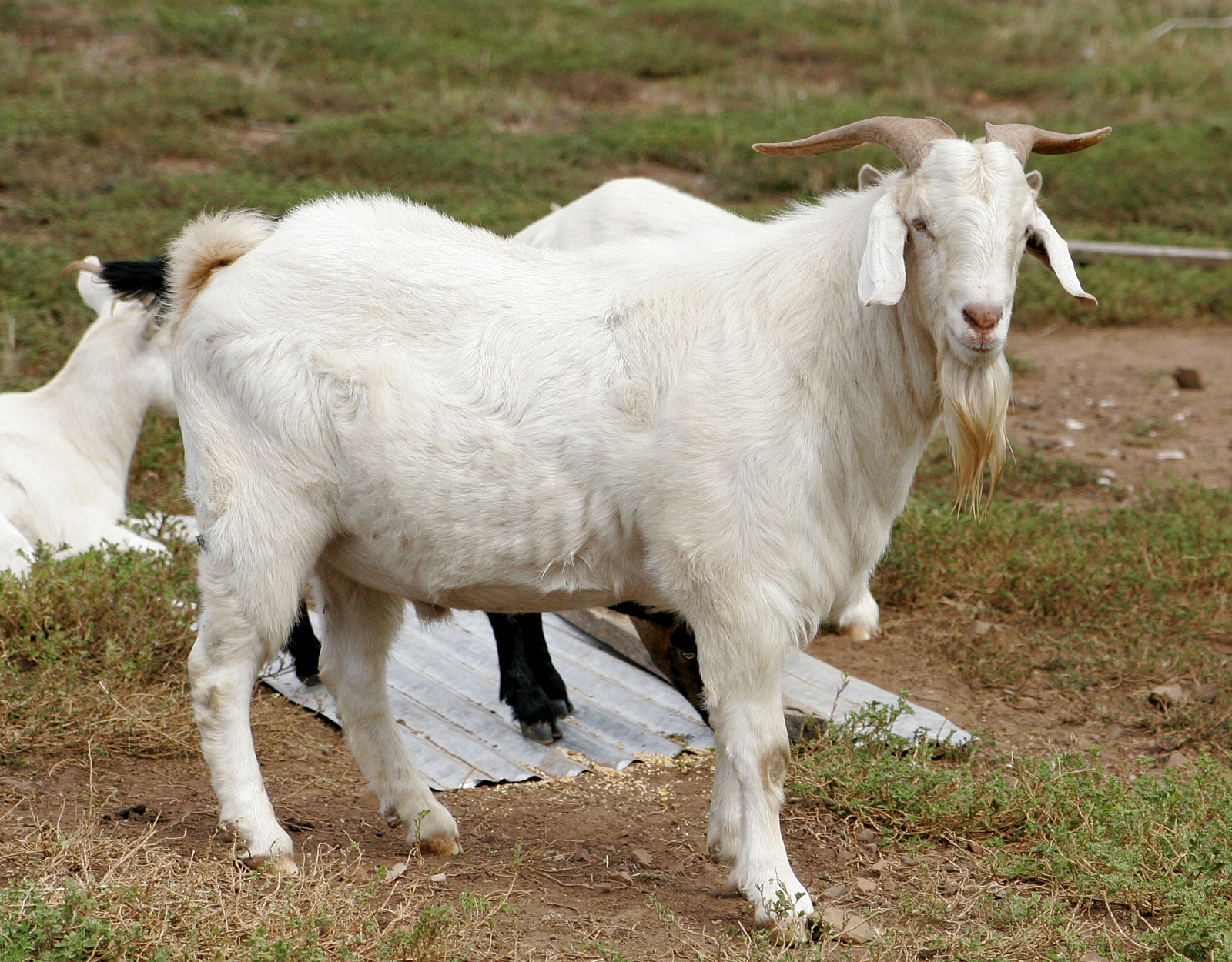
Billy Goat

Goat evolution is the process by which domestic goats came to exist through evolution by natural selection. Wild goats — medium-sized mammals which are found in noticeably harsh environments, particularly forests and mountains,in the Middle East and Central Asia — were one of the first species domesticated by modern humans, with the date of domestication generally considered to be 8,000 BC. Goats are part of the family Bovidae, a broad and populous group which includes a variety of ruminants such as bison, cows and sheep. Bovids all share many traits, such as hooves and a herbivorous diet and all males, along with many females, have horns. Bovids began to diverge from deer and giraffids during the early Miocene epoch. The subfamily Caprinae, which includes goats, ibex and sheep, are considered to have diverged from the rest of Bovidae as early as the late Miocene, with the group reaching its greatest diversity in the ice ages.

The tribe Caprini would subsequently develop from Caprids who arrived in the mountainous areas of Eurasia and split into goats and sheep in response to a further geographic separation. The ancestors of sheep remained in the foothills and the ancestors of goats went to higher altitudes. This divergence resulted in the adaption of the ancestors of goats to a mountainous environment, producing many of the traits considered peculiar to the species. During the ice ages a genus called Capra evolved which would then diverge into the modern goat species, along with several species of ibex.

It is commonly held that the earliest domestication was of the bezoar ibex in the Zagros Mountains. These earliest domesticated goats were used to produce meat and milk for Neolithic farmers, along with providing many of the materials required to build residences and tools. Following the domestication of goats over 300 breeds have been established for a variety of purposes, including for the maximization of milk production and for meat. Domestication and the selective breeding which resulted had a significant effect on the direction of goat evolution, with goats developing behaviour which is considered to have been influenced by consistent proximity to humans. Selective breeding also significantly increased the physical diversity of modern goats, producing characteristics not seen in wild goats.

== Evolution of the family Bovidae ==
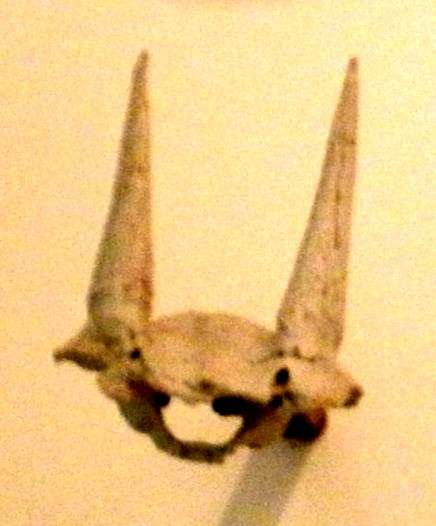
Eotragus, a small deer-like mammal, is the earliest known bovid genus

The closest relatives of bovids are cervids and giraffids, which the group separated from early in its evolutionary lineage. It is generally believed that bovids diverged from deer and giraffids approximately 20 million years ago, in the early part of the Miocene epoch. These early bovids were likely to have lived in woodland environments in the Old World and were small in size and deer-like.

The earliest known Bovid was Eotragus, a genus of small antelope-like animals which were closely related to the modern nilgai and four-horned antelope and lived over much of Eurasia. Although little is known directly about Eotragus many of the traits characteristic to modern bovids have been observed, including crowned teeth. Crowned teeth are assumed to have evolved in order to deal with the tougher vegetation which Eotragus may have been exposed to in the forest. The traits would subsequently carry over to the plains, resulting in bovids becoming adept at processing a variety of grass, and their success in open environments. Horns have also been observed in fossils of Eotragus and were likely used in males to assert dominance and attract mates, as is the case with modern bovids. It is also possible they doubled as a deterrent to potential attackers and a weapon against predators.

Hooves were also present in these early bovids, similar in form and function to the hooves of modern bovids. As Eotragus lived in woodland environments, it remained small in comparison to many modern bovids. The characteristic large size of many modern members of the family Bovidae, whilst not present in the earliest bovid species, became evident in animals found soon after Eotragus as members began to occupy more open environments such as grasslands and savannah.

Early in the natural history of the family there was a divergence into the Boodontia and Aegodontia clades, which are from Africa and Eurasia respectively. This divergence is generally attributed to a momentary continental divide between the two landmasses. The two clades began to coexist after the continents were subsequently rejoined, as the geographic divide disappeared. Modern goats are descended from the early members of the tribe Aegodontia, which encompasses all bovids outside the subfamily Bovinae. Generally, modern bovids vary heavily in their behaviour such as their sociability, with some being solitary and others going in groups. Hence little can be incurred about the behaviour of these early bovids, leaving it relatively unstudied.

== Miocene period, separation of subfamily Caprinae ==
By approximately 15 million years ago, during the late Miocene epoch, the family Bovidae had radiated into around 15 different genera, predominantly concentrated in Asia. Following this the family's diversity increases dramatically and by the end of the Miocene a total of 70 genera are said to have existed. The success of the Bovidae is generally attributed to their ability to rapidly move across plains and to cope with the tough grass found in them due to their crowned teeth. The abundance of grassland in Asia, which benefited ancient bovids considerably, is generally considered to be the reason for the greater success of the family in Asia although many species also performed well in Africa. It was during this period of rapid diversification in the mid-late Miocene that the Caprinae diverged from the other Bovidae. These early Caprids are generally considered to have resembled the Serow, a genus of medium-sized goat-like mammals. Caprids were forced to find their niche away from the plains which were already heavily populated by Cervidae (Deer) and thus developed the characteristic agility required to survive in harsh environments. The habitats occupied by different species of caprids would diverge noticeably and members of the group have since been found in areas ranging from deserts, tundra and alpine environments. However, their universal dependence on harsher environments meant that the subfamily was much more successful in Asia than Africa, as were many other bovid groups.

== Natural history following the divergence of the subfamily Caprinae ==
The subfamily Caprinae has also been subdivided into the tribe Caprini, the group which includes goats and sheep. Selective pressure is generally considered to be the cause for the split between the Caprini and other Caprinae, with early members of the group moving into mountainous regions and developing particular traits in order adapt and to escape predators. The subsequent split between what would become goats and sheep occurred due to a further separation in geography, with the latter occupying the Mesoamerica and the former moving into higher altitudes. This separation and subsequent specialisation is also attributed to the need to escape predators, as the adaption to higher altitudes allowed for easier predator avoidance. In contrast, Sheep developed herding behavior in order to combat the threat posed by predation. Those who remained in South America would subsequently form the Capra genus, which encompasses modern goats along with several species of Ibex, by the most recent ice age. By this time the broader subfamily Caprinae had reached its greatest level of diversity, before experiencing a decline.

The need to adapt to higher altitudes pushed for the development of browsing behaviour due to the lack of low and easily accessible grass, a factor which likely contributed to the evolution of curiosity in goats and their ability to digest plants which would otherwise be poisonous. It also resulted in the development of the ability to climb trees and rocks, an ability distinctive to goats as they are the only bovids to regularly practise such behaviour. The popular conception of goats as creatures who can eat any type of material, and who are difficult to contain with fencing, arises from the aforementioned traits which came as a result of the need to adapt to an unusual environment. The difficulty in containing goats with fences also arises from their naturally high intelligence, which developed in response to a harsh, mountainous terrain. Although they are social and live in groups their bonds are relatively weak and they often do not stay close together, especially when eating, a result of living in an environment comparatively safe from predators. This is also reflected in the unusual behaviour of goat mothers who will allow their children to lie somewhat spread out from each other, in stark contrast to Sheep who make sure their offspring remain close

=== Phylogeny ===
Analysis of cytochrome c DNA and of mitochondrial DNA indicate different phylogenies for the genus Capra.

Cytochrome c:

- Capra
  - C. sibirica (Siberian ibex)
  - - C. nubiana (Nubian ibex)
    - - - C. ibex (Alpine ibex)
        - C. pyrenaica (Iberian ibex)
      - - - C. cylindricornis (East Caucasian tur)
          - C. caucasica (West Caucasian tur) (in part)
        - - C. falconeri (Markhor)
          - - - C. aegagrus (West Asian ibex, wild goat) (in part)
              - C. caucasica (West Caucasian tur) (in part)
            - - C. aegagrus (West Asian ibex, wild goat) (in part)
              - C. hircus (domestic goat)

Mitochondrial DNA analysis (not covering all the species):

- Capra
  - - C. aegagrus (West Asian ibex, wild goat) (in part)
    - C. hircus (domestic goat)
  - - - C. falconeri (Markhor)
      - C. sibirica (Siberian ibex)
    - - C. cylindricornis (East Caucasian tur)
      - - C. aegagrus (West Asian ibex, wild goat) (in part)
        - C. caucasica (West Caucasian tur) (in part)

== Domestication ==
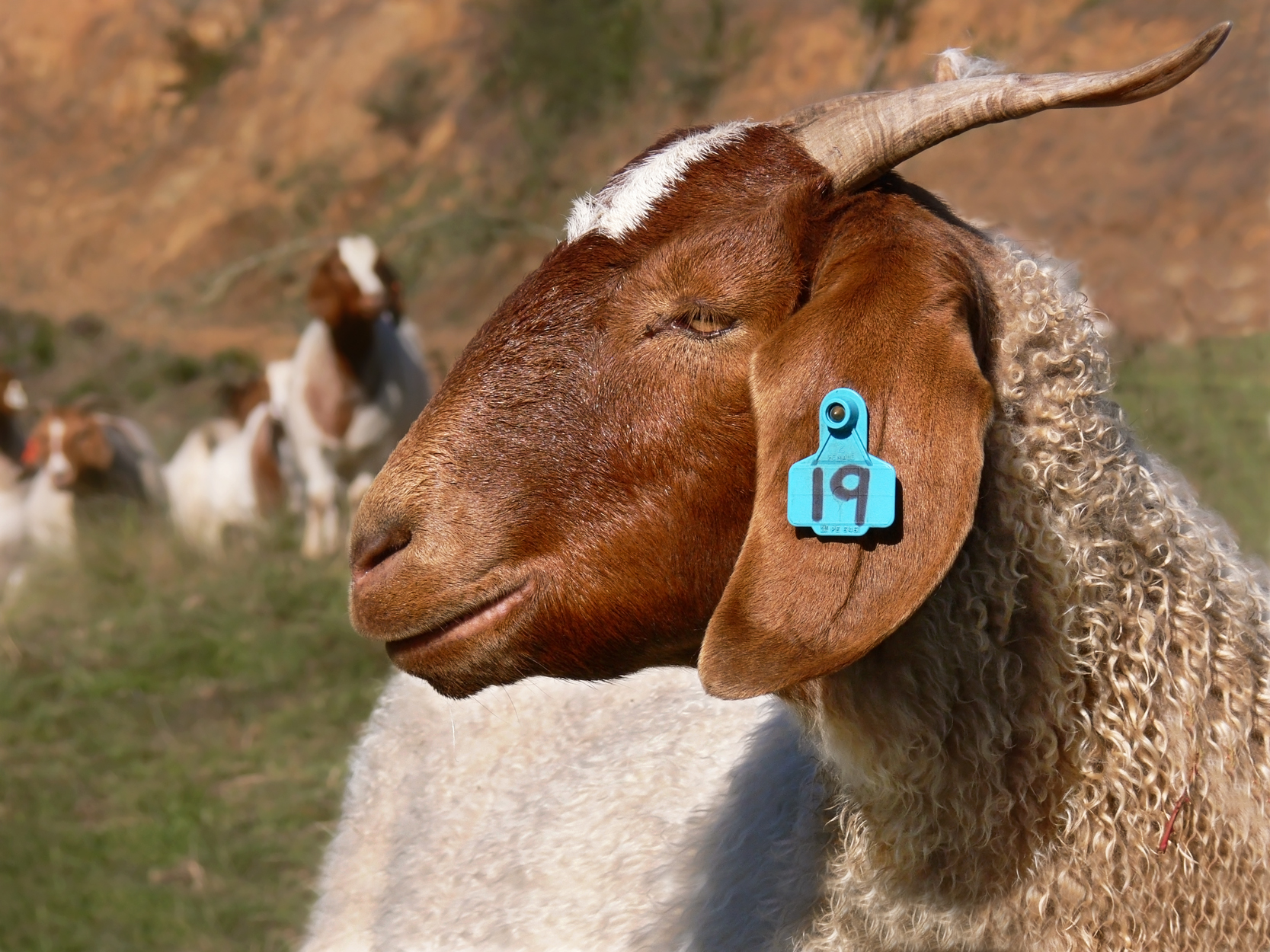
A domesticated goat with a tag

Although estimates vary it is generally held that goats were first domesticated approximately 9,500–9,900 years ago. This occurred in southeastern Anatolia, although separate instances of domestication happened in Iran approximately 6,500 years ago and in eastern Turkey 2,500 years ago. The majority of domesticated goats today are descended from the latter two cases and not from the first. Other evidence for domestication exists in Western Asia, dated approximately 8,000 years ago. Early goat domestication was able to provide meat, milk, clothing and fuel for Neolithic farmers and their remains could also have been used to build shelters and weapons. The domestication process has rapidly increased both the rate of evolutionary development and the genetic diversity of the goat population, with there currently being recorded 300 breeds developed for a variety of purposes.

Consistent with what has been seen with other animals, the behaviour of goats has altered since domestication in response to accelerated evolution from thousands of years of interacting with humans and selective breeding. Goats have adapted to human presence.
