= Khirokitia =

Village in Cyprus

- Χοιροκοιτία (Greek)
- Choirokoitia
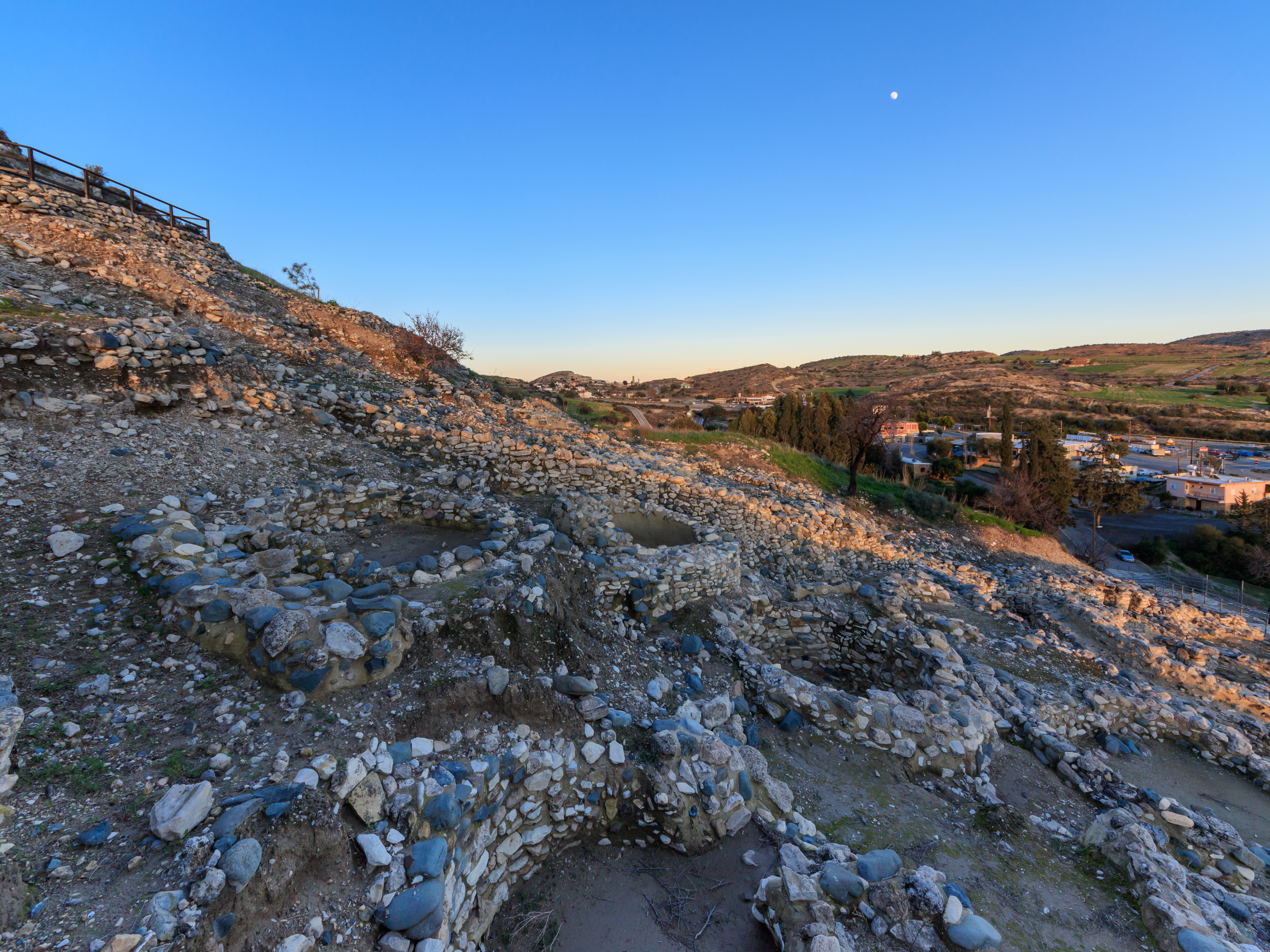
- View of Khirokitia

- Location on the island of Cyprus
- 34°47′48.21″N 33°20′37.39″E
- Type: Settlement
- Location: Choirokoitia, Larnaca, Cyprus

History
- Built: c. 7000 BC
- Abandoned: c. 3500 BC

Site notes
- Discovered: 1934 by Porphyrios Dikaios
- Management: Cyprus Department of Antiquities

UNESCO World Heritage Site
- Official name: Choirokoitia
- Type: Cultural
- Criteria: ii, iii, iv
- Designated: 1998 (22ns session), modified 2012
- Reference no.: 848bis
- Region: Europe and North America

Khirokitia (sometimes spelled Choirokoitia; Greek: Χοιροκοιτία [çiɾociˈti.a], suggested meaning Pig-cradle, from χοίρος 'pig, boar' + κοιτίς 'place of origin, cradle') is an archaeological site on the island of Cyprus dating from the Neolithic age. It has been listed as a World Heritage Site by UNESCO since 1998. The site is known as one of the most important and best preserved prehistoric sites of the eastern Mediterranean. Much of its importance lies in the evidence of an organised functional society in the form of a collective settlement, with surrounding fortifications for communal protection. The Neolithic aceramic period is represented by this settlement and around 20 other similar settlements spread throughout the island.

== Discovery ==
The site was discovered in 1934 by Porphyrios Dikaios, director of the Department of Antiquities who carried out six excavations between 1934 and 1946. His initial findings were published in The Journal of Hellenic Studies in 1934. Dikaios initially believed the settlement was established around 4000 BC. However, radiocarbon dating revealed a foundation date of around 7000 BC. Further excavations were then held in the early 1970s but were interrupted by the 1974 Turkish invasion of Cyprus. A French mission under the direction of Alain Le Brun resumed excavation of the site in 1977. It was occupied from the 7th until the 4th millennium BC.

== Archaeology ==
The settlement of Khirokitia was situated on the slope of a hill in the valley of the Maroni River, towards the southern coast of the island about 6 km (3.7 mi) from the sea. Subsistence methods practiced by its Neolithic inhabitants included farming crops like wheat, barley, lentils, peas, horse bean, and vetch, foraging olives, flax, figs, pistachios, plums, and pears, herding sheep, goats, and pigs, and hunting deer. It was a closed village, cut off from the outside world –apart from by the river– by a strong wall of stones 2.5 m (8.2 ft) thick and 3 m (9.8 ft) at its highest preserved level. The village was probably accessed via several entry points through the wall. The buildings within this wall consist of round structures huddled close together, called tholoi, between 2 and 9 m (6.6 and 29.5 ft) in diameter, which may have had windows. These tholoi are organized in tight groups around an unroofed "courtyard", which scholars believe represents family groups. The lower parts of these buildings are often made of stone and attain massive proportions by constant additions of further skins of stones. A collapsed flat roof of one building indicates that not all roofs were dome shaped as was originally believed.

Each hut was divided internally according to the purpose of its usage. Low walls, platforms designated work, rest or storage areas. They had hearths presumably used for cooking and heating, benches and windows and in many cases there is evidence of piers to support an upper floor. It is believed that the huts were like rooms several of which were grouped around an open courtyard and together formed the home. The population of the village at any one time is thought not to have exceeded 300 to 600 inhabitants. The people were rather short – the men about 160 centimeters (5 ft 3 in) on average and the women about 150 centimeters (4 ft 11 in). Infant mortality was very high. On average adult men reached 35 years of age and women 33. The dead were buried in crouched positions just under the floors of the houses. In some instances provision was made for offerings, possibly indicating a form of ancestor cult within the households. This, the earliest known culture in Cyprus, consisted of a well-organised, developed society mainly engaged in farming, hunting and herding. Farming was mainly of cereal crops. They also gathered fruit in the surrounding area such as pistachio nuts, figs, olives and plums. The four main species of animals whose remains were found on the site were deer, sheep, goats and pigs.

The village of Khirokoitia was suddenly abandoned for unknown reasons around 6000 BC and it seems that the island remained uninhabited for about 1,500 years until the next recorded entity, the Sotira group. More recent discoveries, however, including several sites in the vicinity of the ancient acropolis of Amathus on the eastern edge of modern Limassol, have filled this chronological gap considerably, revealing that the island was probably occupied continuously from at least the ninth millennium BC. Early communities were small and widely dispersed, so not every region would have been as heavily exploited as later in prehistory.

== Village name ==
According to the dominating opinion the name of the village is a composite of the word "Khiros" (hog / pig) and the word "Kiti", thus suggesting an area where pigs were raised. Other sources claim that the original name was "Sidirokitida", thus an area where iron was found. It is also said that it might have originated from the word "Khirogetia", which implies the practice of palmistry. Another opinion suggests it may have originated from some initial name like "Ierokitida" (Sacred place). Others claim that the name came from the words "gyros" and "oikia" due to the fact that the prehistoric huts are round. Furthermore, tradition has it that the name is derived from the phrase "Chere Kitia" a phrase used by the Queen "Rigena" to address a certain female friend of hers from Kition. It was also claimed that maybe the name originated from the plant Cherimoya, which is found cultivated in Cyprus under the name "Cheromolia", although this is considered very unlikely. At any rate, in old maps the village is marked as either Cherochetica or as Chierochitia.

== Gallery ==
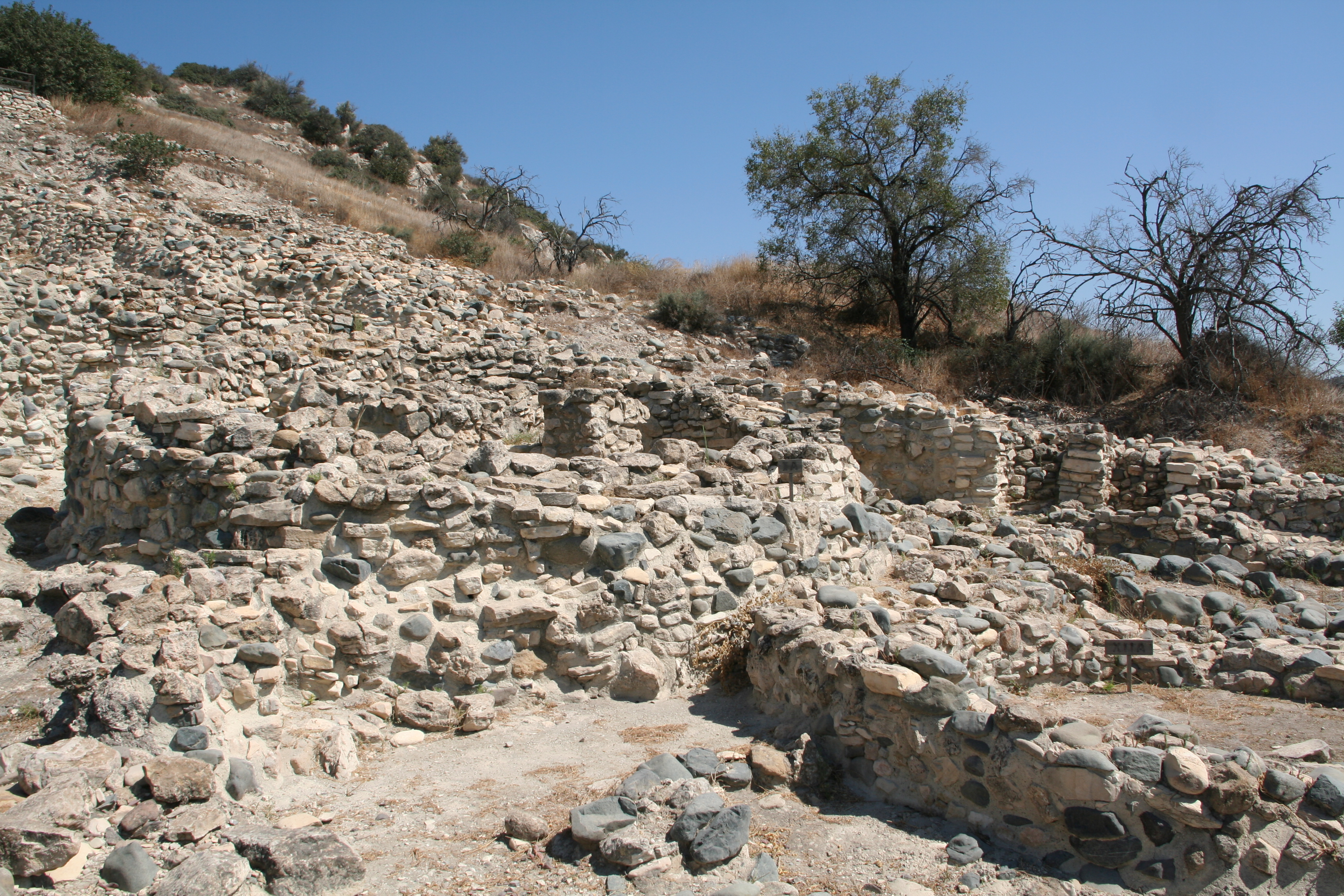

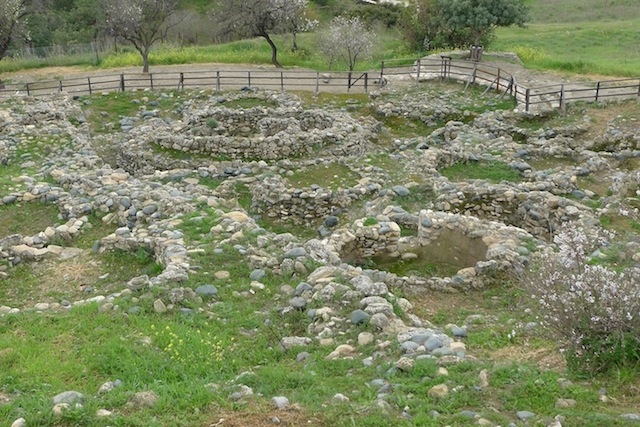

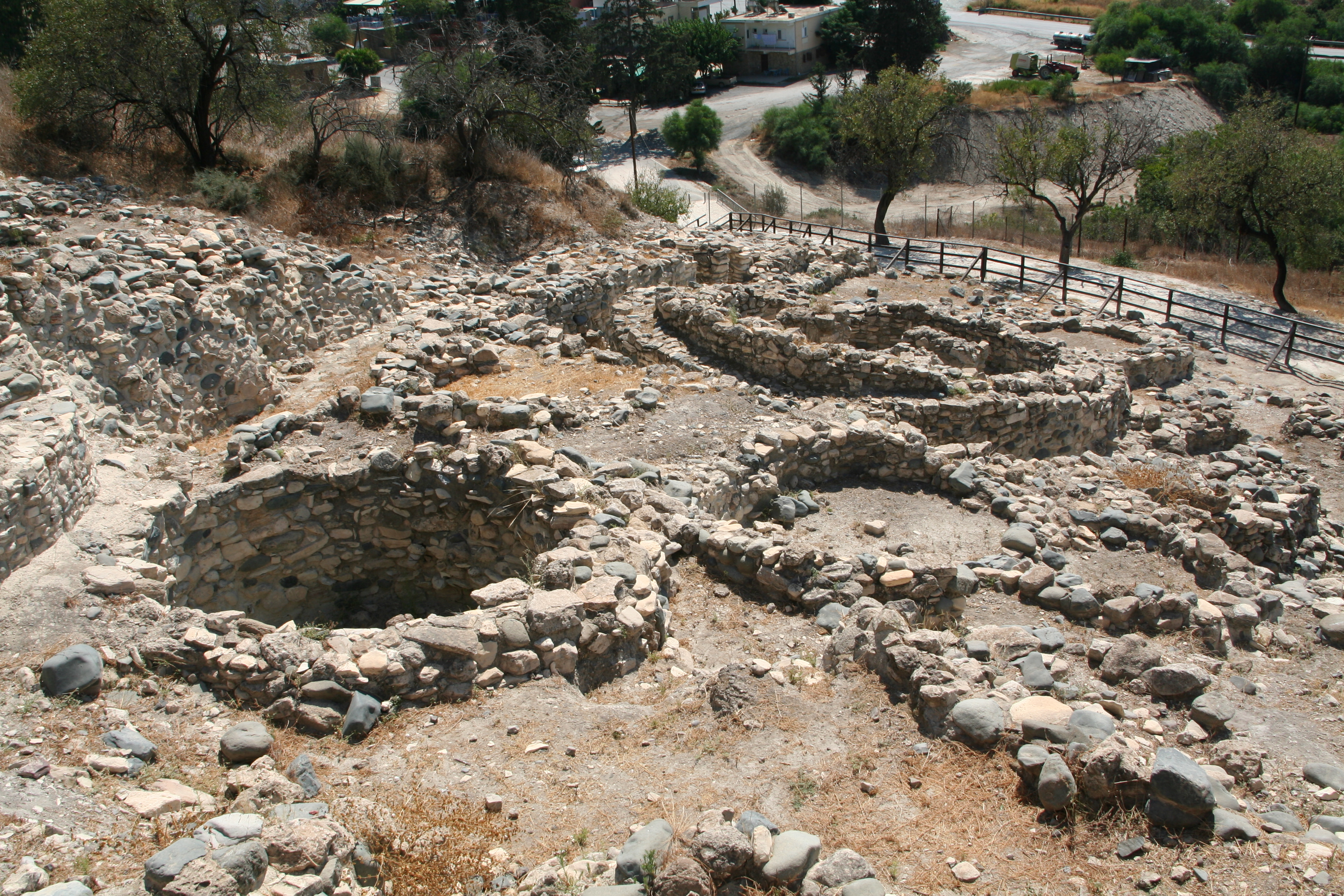

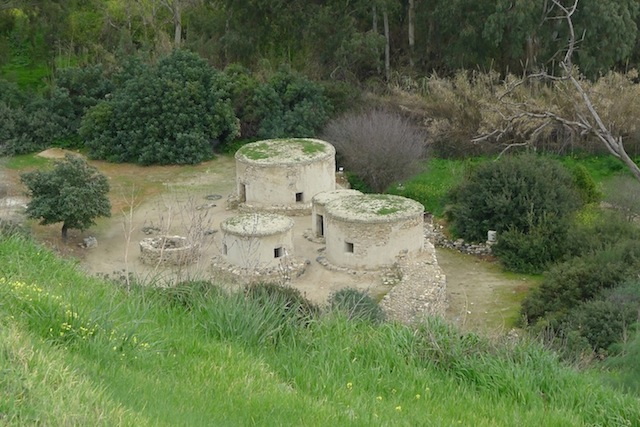
Reconstructed structures

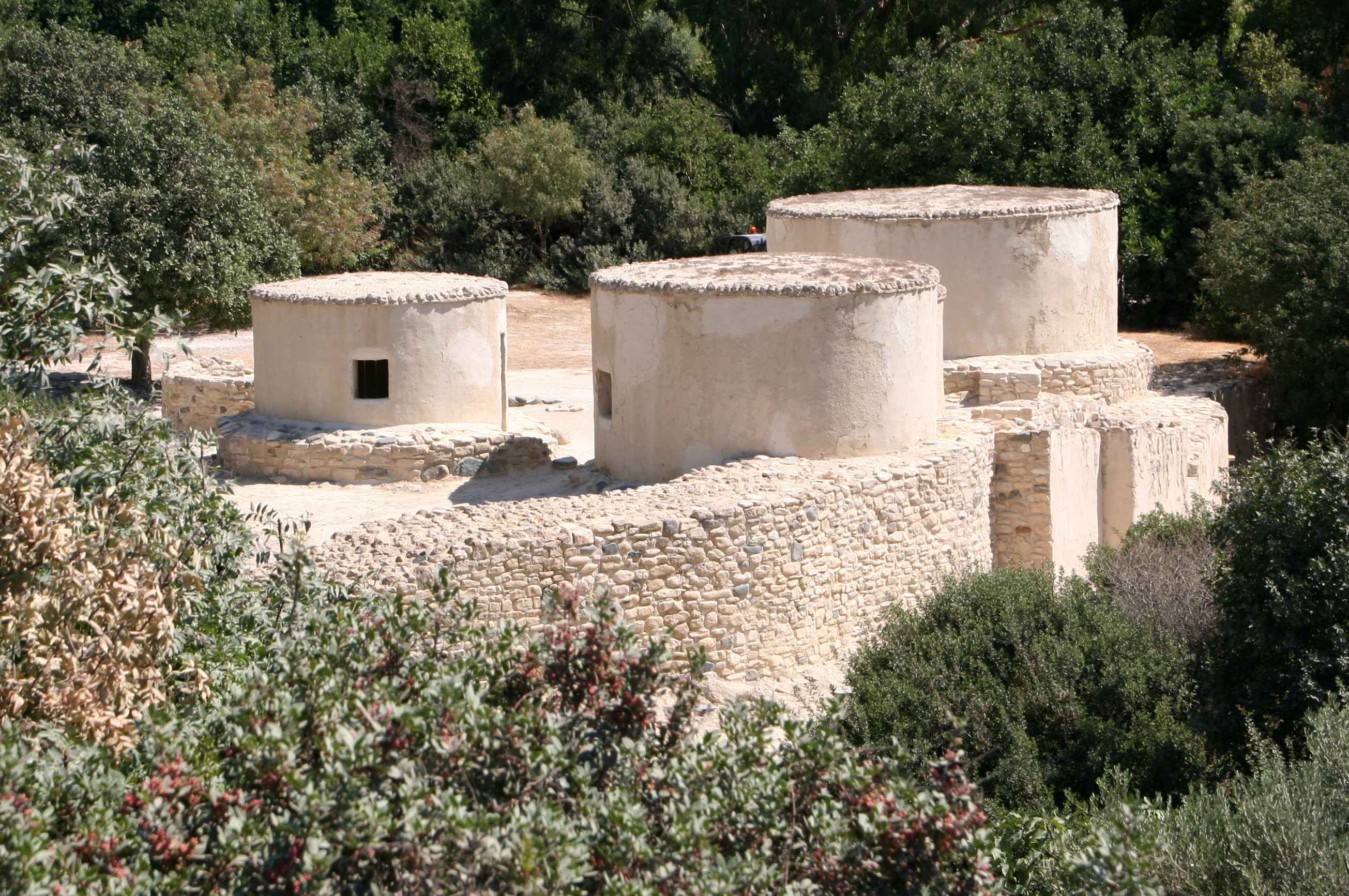
Reconstructed structures

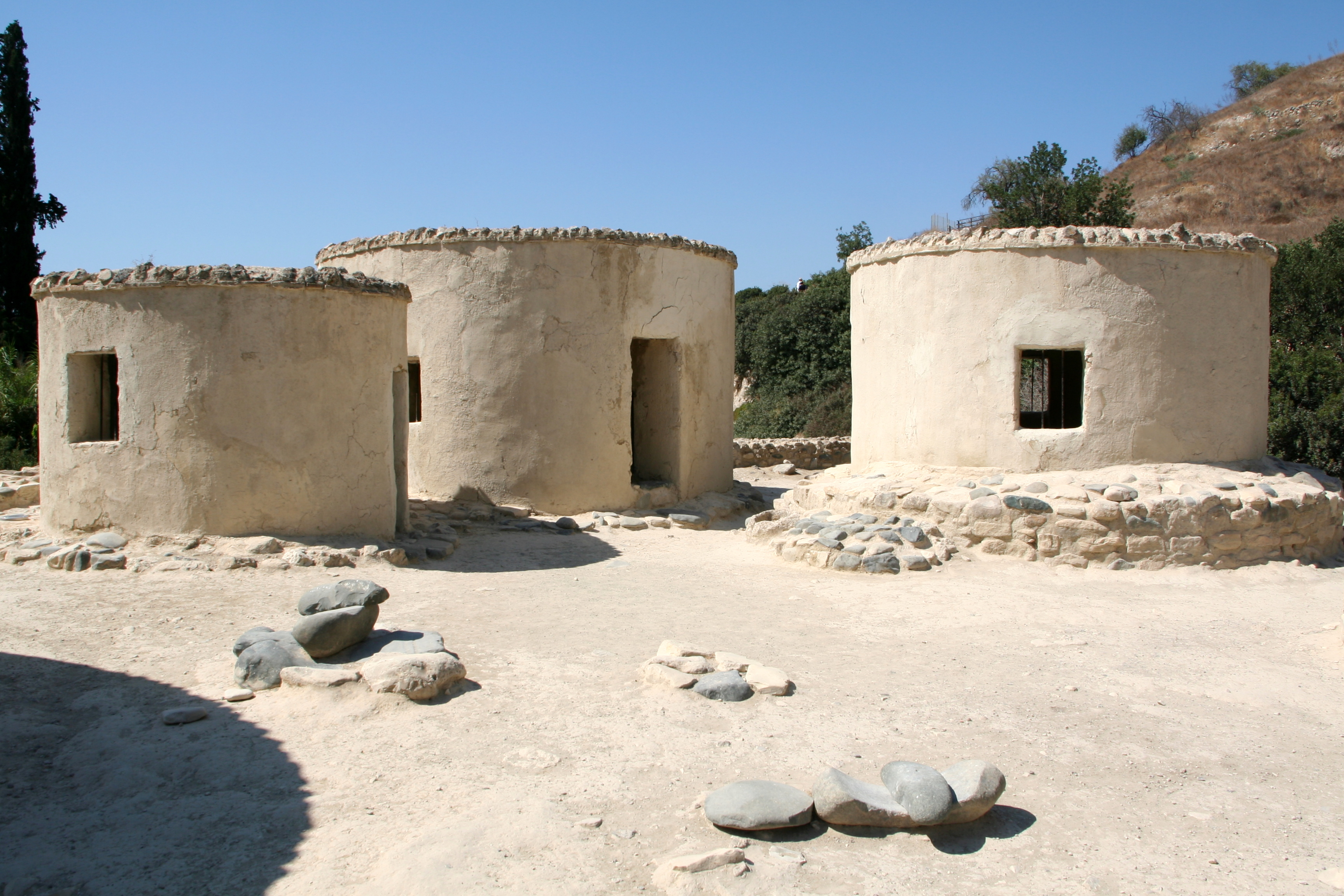
Reconstructed structures

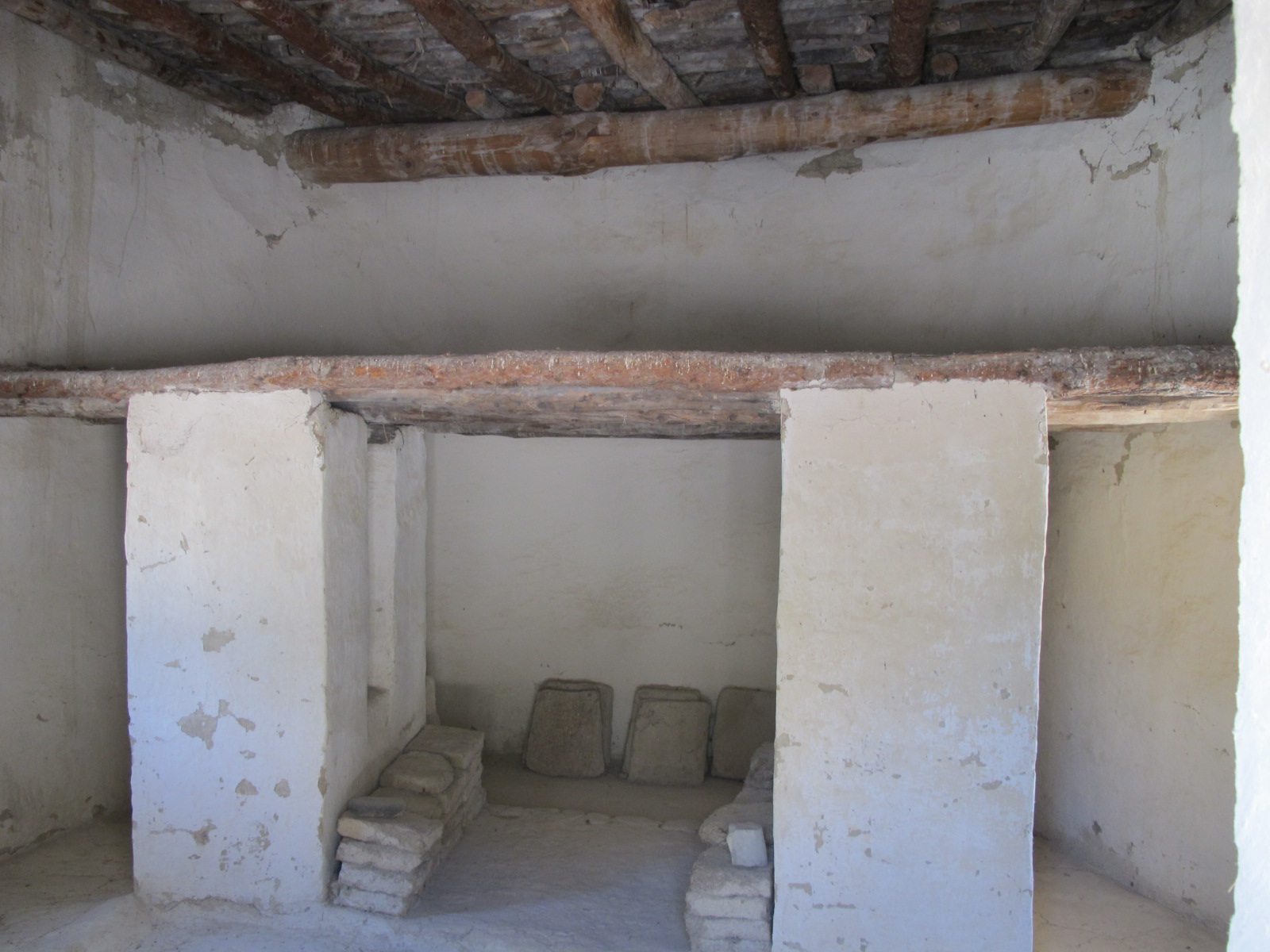
Reconstructed structures

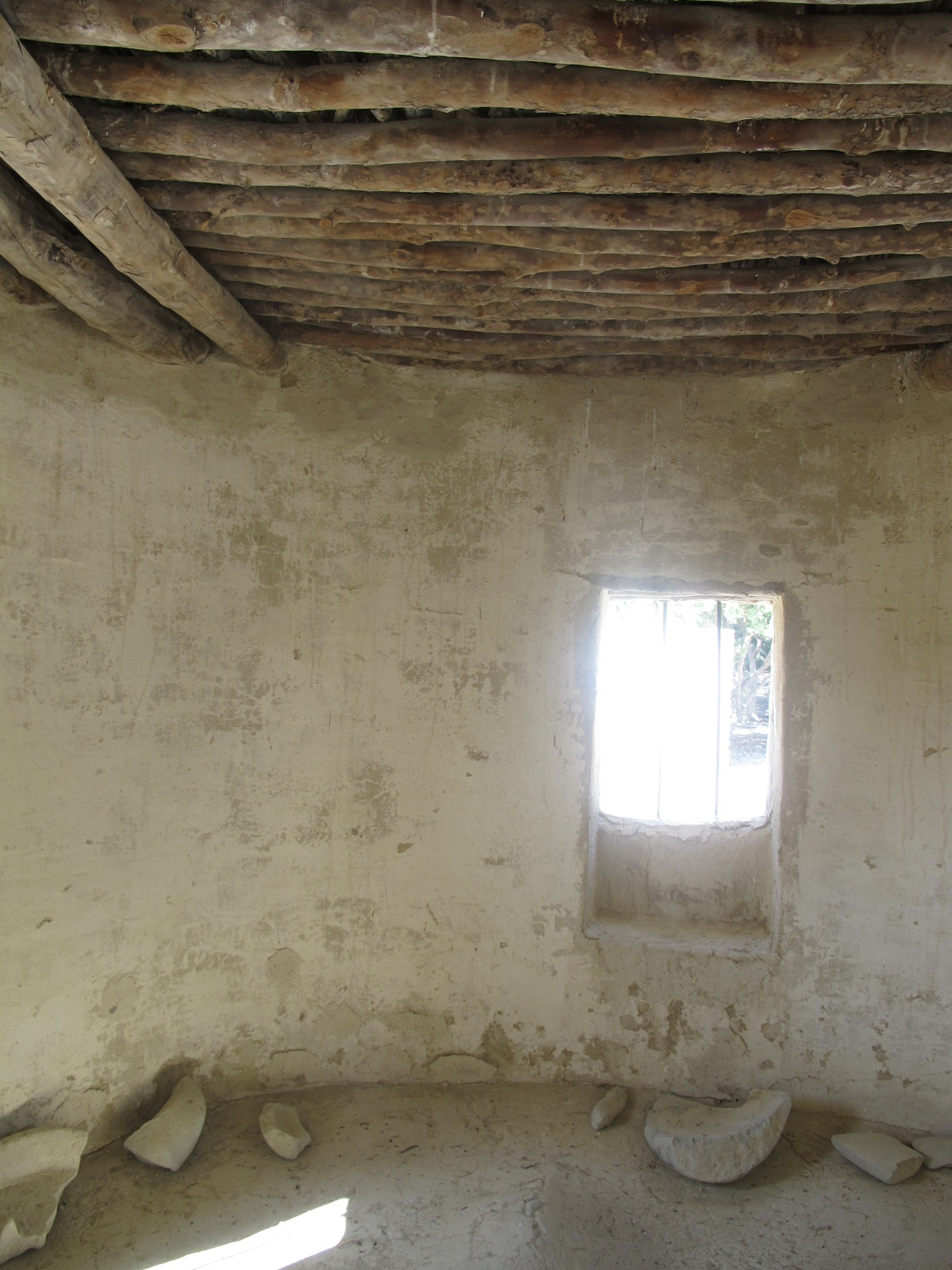
Reconstructed structures

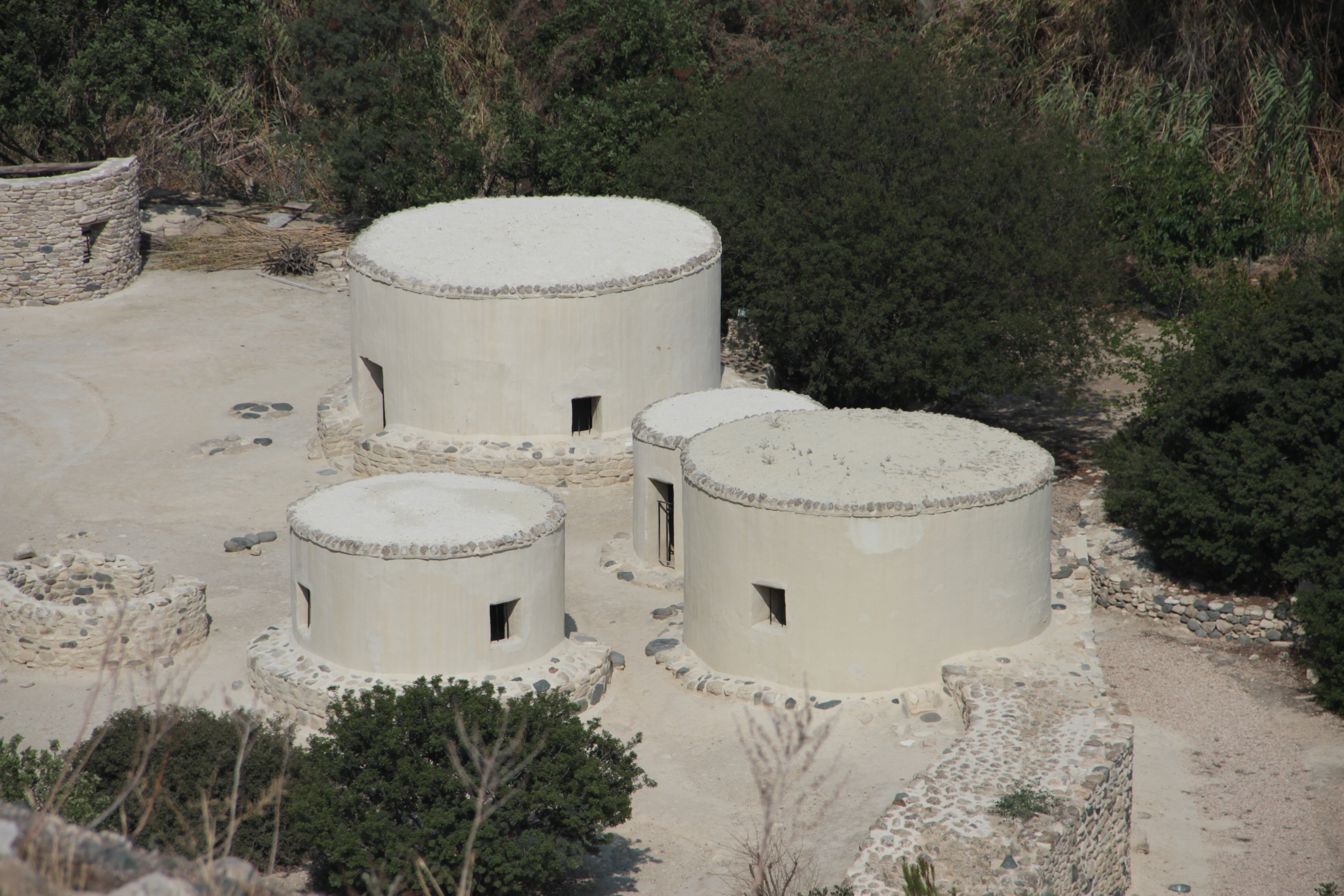
Reconstructed structures

== See also ==
- List of World Heritage Sites in Western Asia

== Sources ==
- Department of Antiquities, Government of Cyprus
