= Idalion Temple inscriptions =

Phoenician inscriptions

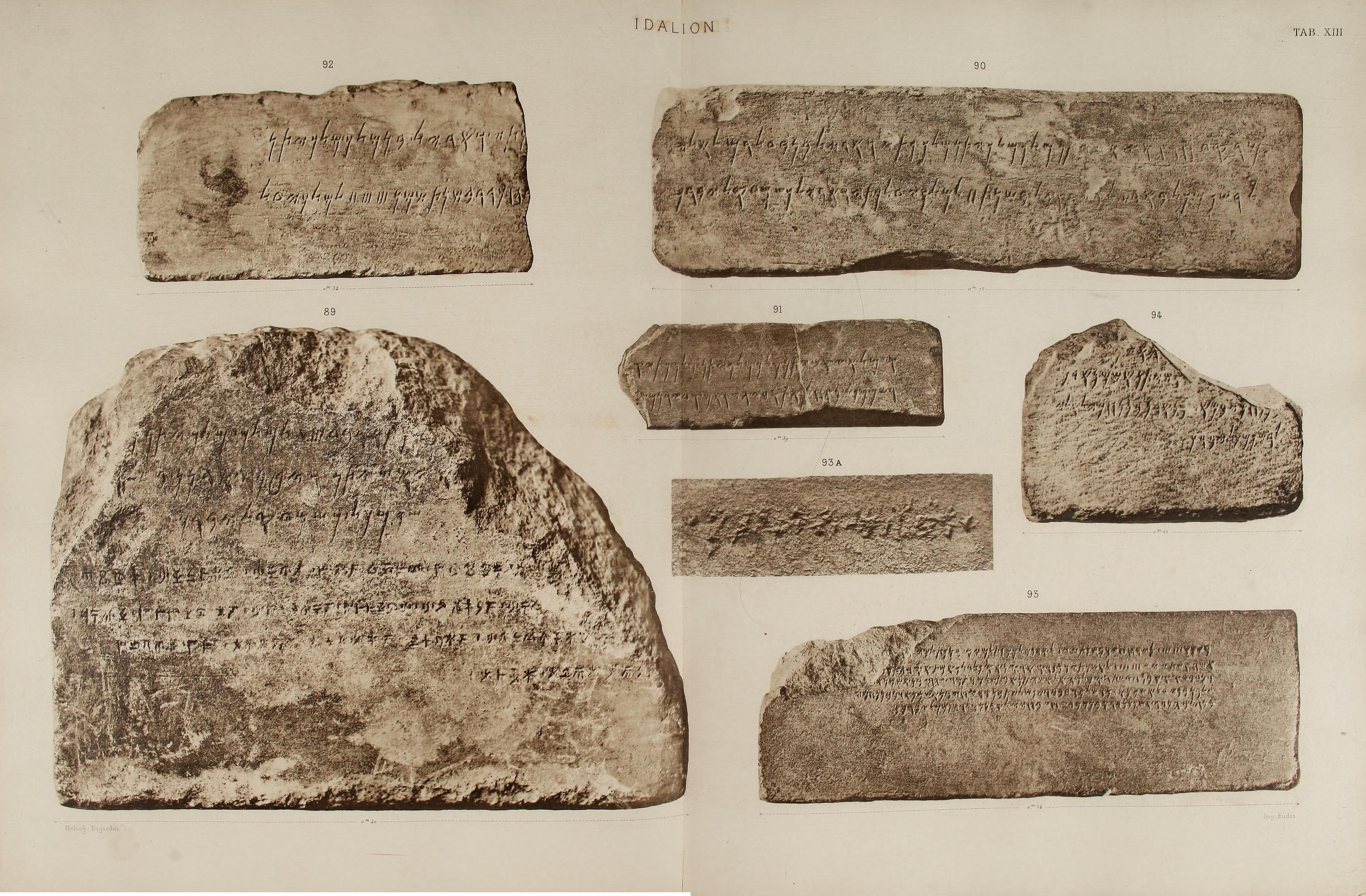
The Idalion Temple inscriptions in the Corpus Inscriptionum Semiticarum (CIS I 89–94)

The Idalion Temple inscriptions are six Phoenician inscriptions found by Robert Hamilton Lang in his excavations at the Temple of Idalion (modern Dali, Cyprus) in 1869, whose work there had been inspired by the discovery of the Idalion Tablet in 1850. The most famous of these inscriptions is known as the Idalion bilingual. The Phoenician inscriptions are known as KAI 38-40 and CIS I 89-94.

They are currently at the British Museum. The discovery was first announced by Paul Schröder in 1872.

== The inscriptions ==
Name	Image	Date	Concordance						
Name	Image	Date	KAI	CIS / RES	NE	KI	NSI	TSSI	Museum ID
Number 1 (Idalion bilingual)	An inscription	388 BC	39	I 89					BM 125320
Number 2	An inscription	391 BC	38	I 90	421,1	31	24	III 34	BM 125315
Number 3	An inscription			I 91	421,2	32	25		BM 125328
Number 4	An inscription	354 BC		I 92			26		BM 125326
Number 5	An inscription	254 BC	40	I 93	421,3	33	27		BM 125327 (replica)
Number 6	An inscription			I 94					BM 125316
