= Idalion bilingual =

Archaeological artifact discovered in 1869

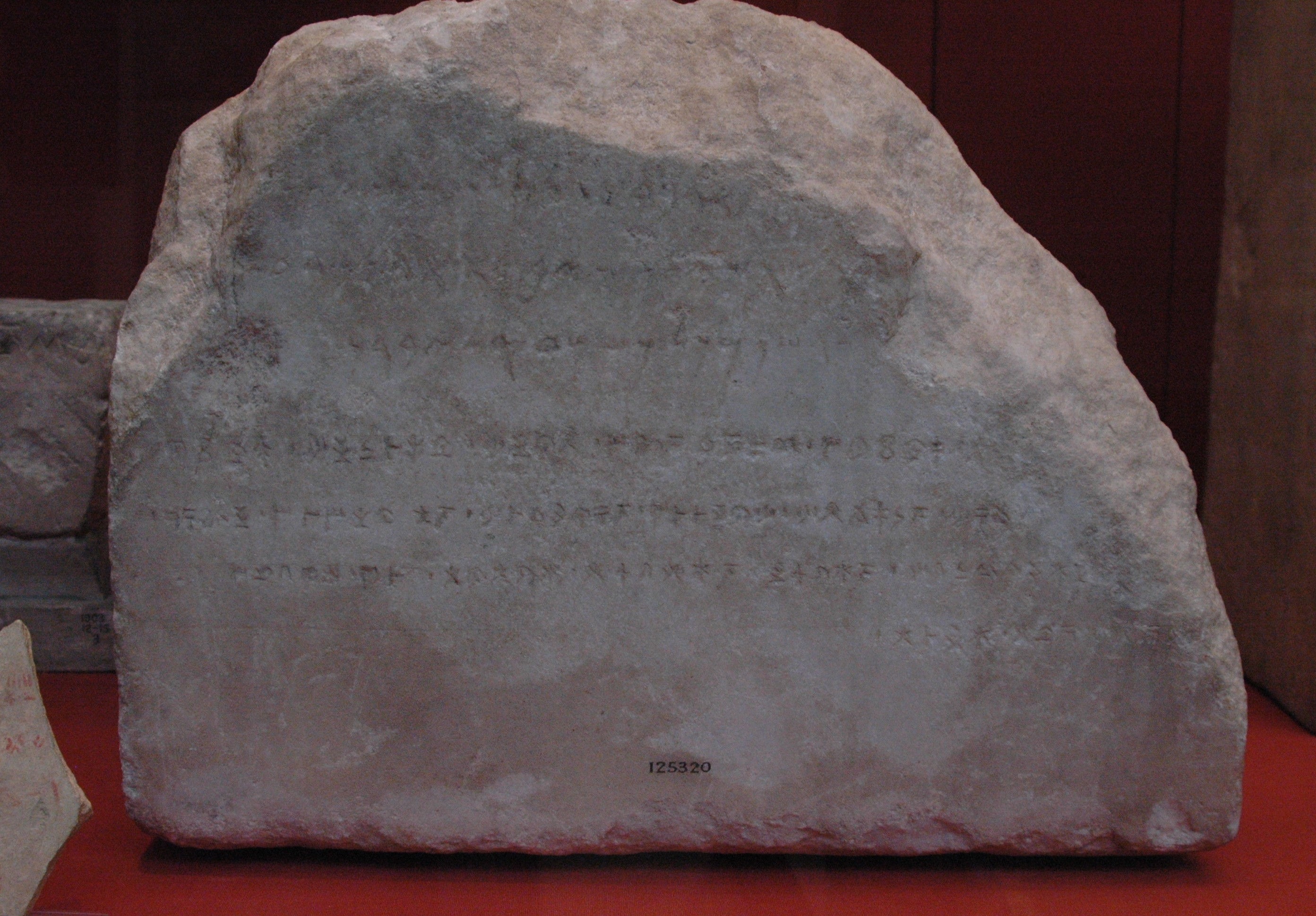
- Idalion Bilingual at the British Museum in 2007
- Created: c. 388 BCE
- Discovered: 1869; Dali, Nicosia, Cyprus
- Discovered by: Robert Lang
- Present location: London, England, United Kingdom
- Language: Phoenician and Greek

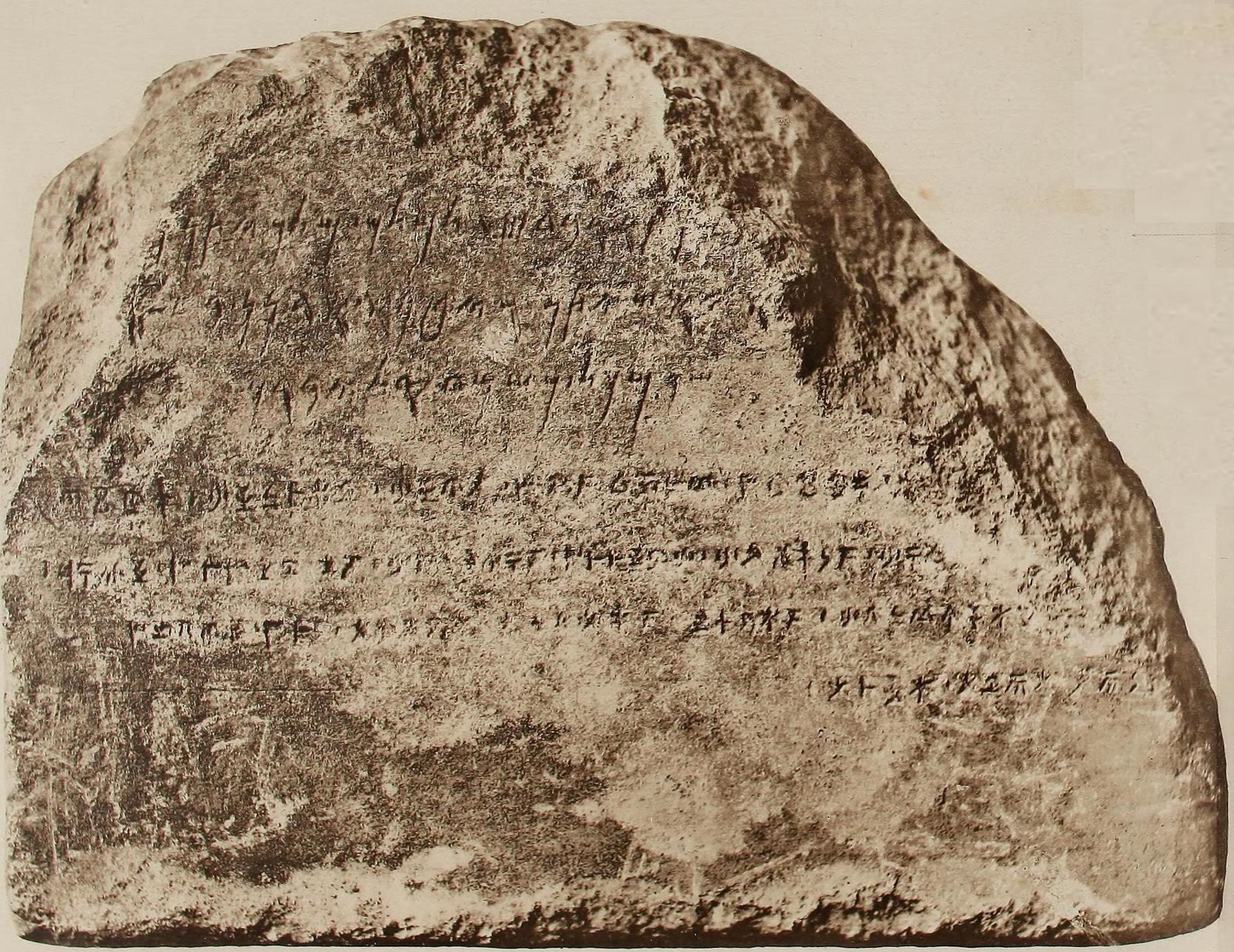
The inscription, known as BM 125320

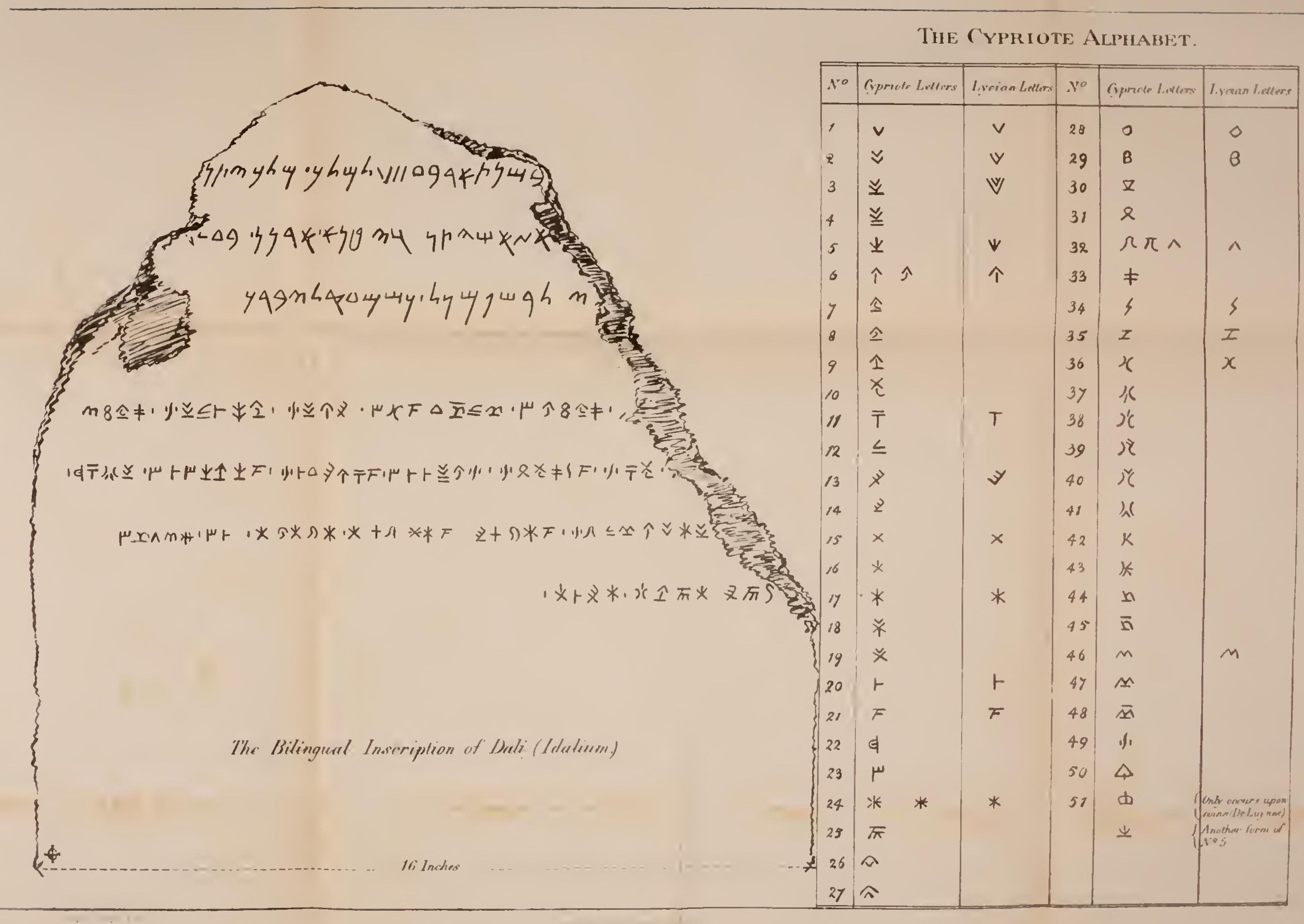
George Smith's decipherment of the Cypriot syllabary

The Idalion bilingual is a bilingual Cypriot–Phoenician inscription found in 1869 in Dali, Cyprus. It was the key to the decipherment of the Cypriot syllabary, in the manner of the Rosetta Stone to hieroglyphs. The discovery of the inscription was first announced by Paul Schröder in May 1872. It is dated to 388 BCE. The Phoenician inscription is known as KAI 38 and CIS I 89.

It was discovered by Robert Hamilton Lang in his excavations at the Temple of Idaliom, whose work there had been inspired by the discovery of the Idalion Tablet in 1850. The stone was found in the centre of the temple, together with the five other Idalion Temple inscriptions. The stone is thought to have been a pedestal for a statue, as there is an apparent dowel hole in the top.

Lang wrote of his discovery:

The most valuable monument uncovered by my excavations is unquestionably the bilingual inscription in Cyprian and Phoenician, engraved on marble; an inscription which, I feel confident, will ultimately prove the means of enabling philologists to decipher the Cyprian alphabet ... The bilingual inscription proves also that, the two alphabets, Phoenician and Cyprian, had a contemporaneous existence.

It is currently in the archives of the British Museum, with identification number 125320. It was exhibited at the Fitzwilliam Museum in Cambridge in 2018.

== Inscriptions ==
=== Phoenician ===
The Phoenician inscription is three lines long:

[𐤁𐤉𐤌𐤌 ? 𐤋𐤉𐤓𐤇 ?] 𐤁𐤔𐤍𐤕 𐤀𐤓𐤁𐤏 𐤖𐤖𐤖𐤖 𐤋𐤌𐤋𐤊 · 𐤌𐤋𐤊𐤉𐤕𐤍 [𐤌𐤋𐤊]
[bymm ? lyrḥ ?] bšnt ʾrbʿ 4 lmlk · mlkytn [mlk]
[On day ? of the month ?] in year four (4) of King Milkyaton, [king of]

[𐤊𐤕𐤉 𐤅𐤀𐤃𐤉𐤋 𐤎𐤌𐤋] 𐤀𐤆 𐤀𐤔 𐤉𐤕𐤍 𐤅𐤉𐤈𐤍𐤀 · 𐤀𐤃𐤍 · 𐤁𐤏𐤋𐤓[𐤌]
[kty wʾdyl sml] ʾz ʾš ytn wyṭnʾ · ʾdn · bʿlr[m]
[Kition and Idalion: this is] the statue which was given and raised by Lord Baalro[m,]

[𐤁𐤍 𐤏𐤁𐤃𐤌𐤋𐤊 𐤋𐤀𐤋]𐤉 𐤋𐤓𐤔𐤐 𐤌𐤊𐤋 · 𐤊 𐤔𐤌 𐤒𐤋 𐤉𐤁𐤓𐤊
[bn ʿbdmlk lʾl]y lršp mkl · k šm ql ybrk
[son of Abdimilk, to his go]d Reshep Mikal, because he heard his voice: may he bless.

=== Cypriot ===
The Cypriot inscription is written in the Greek language. It is four lines long, also written right-to-left. It was used by George Smith to decipher the Cypriot syllabary in 1871, in the manner of the Rosetta Stone to hieroglyphs. It is dated to 388 BCE. Subsequently, Egyptologist Samuel Birch (1872), numismatist Johannes Brandis (1873), philologists Moritz Schmidt, Wilhelm Deecke, Justus Siegismund (1874) and dialectologist H. L. Ahrens (1876) all built on Smith's decipherment of the stone.

] ' 𐠞𐠪𐠐𐠵𐠩 ' 𐠖𐠑𐠌𐠅𐠰𐠜𐠩 ' 𐠋𐠯𐠃𐠚 ' 𐠊𐠁𐠭𐠑𐠃𐠚 ' 𐠞𐠪𐠐𐠄
] ' pa-si-le-wo-se ' mi-li-ki-ja-to-no-se ' ke-ti-o-ne ' ka-e-ta-li-o-ne ' pa-si-le-u
[In the fourth year] of King Milkyaton, reigning over Kition and Idalion,

]𐠕𐠙𐠚 ' 𐠰𐠟𐠞𐠕𐠦𐠚 ' 𐠚𐠵𐠫𐠭𐠭𐠩 ' 𐠰𐠙𐠯𐠥𐠅𐠭𐠚 ' 𐠰𐠮𐠊𐠮𐠩𐠭𐠩 ' 𐠃𐠲𐠙𐠸
]-me-na-ne ' to-pe-pa-me-ro-ne ' ne-wo-so-ta-ta-se ' to-na-ti-ri-ja-ta-ne ' to-te-ka-te-se-ta-se ' o-wa-na-kse
[on the last (day)] of the period of five intercalary days, the prince

]𐠃𐠀𐠠𐠯𐠖𐠑𐠍𐠚 ' 𐠰𐠀𐠡𐠒𐠛 ' 𐠰𐠀𐠘𐠍𐠒𐠂 ' 𐠀𐠡𐠂𐠵𐠂 ' 𐠭𐠩 ' 𐠁𐠄𐠍𐠏𐠩
]-o-a-pi-ti-mi-li-ko-ne ' to-a-po-lo-ni ' to-a-mu-ko-lo-i ' a-po-i-wo-i ' ta-se ' e-u-ko-la-se
[Baalrom son o]f Abdimilk, has dedicated this statuette to Apollo Amyklos, from whom he has obtained the accomplishment of his wish.

[𐠁]𐠟𐠱𐠋 ' 𐠂𐠱𐠊𐠂 ' 𐠀𐠊𐠭𐠂 '
[e]-pe-tu-ke ' i-tu-ka-i ' a-ka-ta-i '
[T]o good fortune.

== Bibliography ==
- On the Reading of the Cypriote Inscriptions George Smith, 1871

== See also ==
- Multilingual inscription
