= Aegean script =

Aegean script or Cretan script refers to a group of scripts that originate from the island of Crete. It may also refer to:

- Cretan hieroglyphs, found on artifacts of early Bronze Age Crete, during the Minoan era, before Linear A
- Linear A, one of two currently undeciphered writing systems used in ancient Greece
- Linear B (Creto-Mycenaean script), a syllabic script that was used for writing Mycenaean Greek

== See also ==
- Phaistos Disc, a disk of fired clay from the Minoan palace of Phaistos on the island of Crete
- Cypro-Minoan script, an undeciphered syllabary used on the island of Cyprus during the late Bronze Age
- Cypriot script, a syllabic script used in Iron Age Cyprus
- Greek script, the Greek alphabet used since the late 9th century BC
