= Aegean Numbers (Unicode block) =

- Range: U+10100..U+1013F (64 code points)
- Plane: SMP
- Scripts: Common
- Assigned: 57 code points
- Unused: 7 reserved code points

Unicode version history
- 4.0 (2003): 57 (+57)

Unicode documentation
- Code chart ∣ Web page

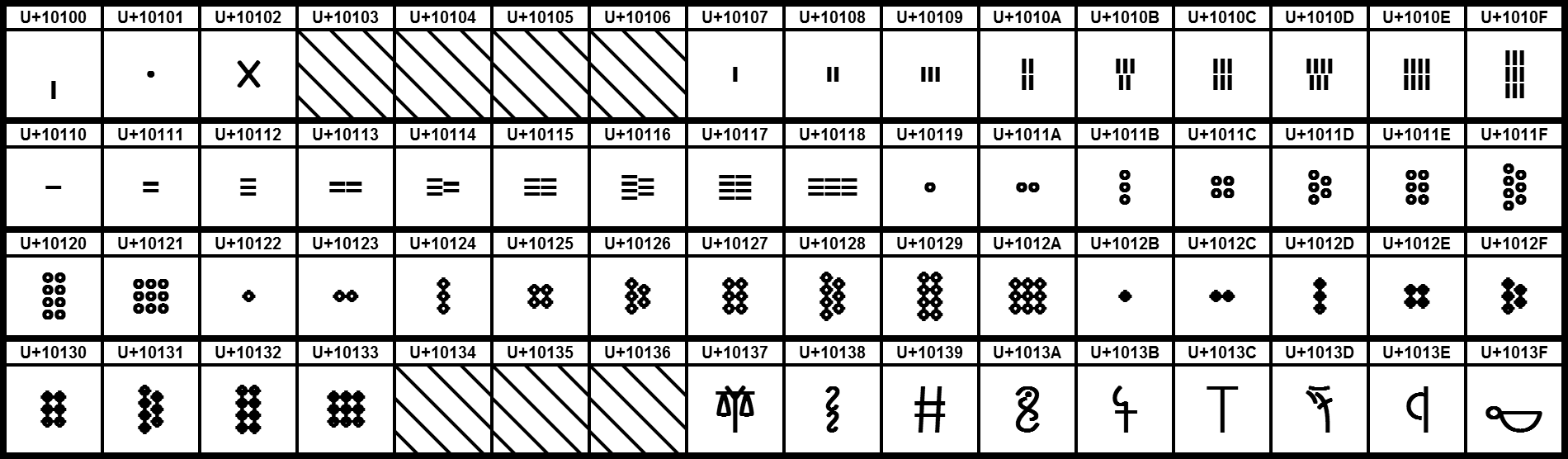
Graphical representation of the Aegean Numbers Unicode block

Aegean Numbers is a Unicode block containing punctuation, number, and unit characters for Linear A, Linear B, and the Cypriot syllabary, together Aegean numerals.

Aegean Numbers^{[1]}^{[2]} Official Unicode Consortium code chart (PDF)
	0	1	2	3	4	5	6	7	8	9	A	B	C	D	E	F
U+1010x	𐄀	𐄁	𐄂					𐄇	𐄈	𐄉	𐄊	𐄋	𐄌	𐄍	𐄎	𐄏
U+1011x	𐄐	𐄑	𐄒	𐄓	𐄔	𐄕	𐄖	𐄗	𐄘	𐄙	𐄚	𐄛	𐄜	𐄝	𐄞	𐄟
U+1012x	𐄠	𐄡	𐄢	𐄣	𐄤	𐄥	𐄦	𐄧	𐄨	𐄩	𐄪	𐄫	𐄬	𐄭	𐄮	𐄯
U+1013x	𐄰	𐄱	𐄲	𐄳				𐄷	𐄸	𐄹	𐄺	𐄻	𐄼	𐄽	𐄾	𐄿
Notes: 1. As of Unicode version 16.0; 2. Grey areas indicate non-assigned code points

== History ==
The following Unicode-related documents record the purpose and process of defining specific characters in the Aegean Numbers block:

Version	Final code points (Note: Proposed code points and characters names may differ from final code points and names)	Count	L2 ID	WG2 ID	Document
4.0	U+10100..10102, 10107..10133, 10137..1013F	57	L2/97-105	N1575	Jenkins, John H. (1997-05-21), Overview of the Aegean scripts
4.0	U+10100..10102, 10107..10133, 10137..1013F	57	L2/97-107		Jenkins, John H. (1997-05-27), Proposal to add the Linear B script to ISO/IEC 10646
4.0	U+10100..10102, 10107..10133, 10137..1013F	57	L2/97-288	N1603	Umamaheswaran, V. S. (1997-10-24), "8.24.1", Unconfirmed Meeting Minutes, WG 2 Meeting # 33, Heraklion, Crete, Greece, 20 June – 4 July 1997
4.0	U+10100..10102, 10107..10133, 10137..1013F	57	L2/00-128		Bunz, Carl-Martin (2000-03-01), Scripts from the Past in Future Versions of Unicode
4.0	U+10100..10102, 10107..10133, 10137..1013F	57	L2/01-084		Anderson, Deborah (2001-01-28), Status Report on Aegean Script Proposal (Linear B, Aegean Numbers and Cypriot Syllabary)
4.0	U+10100..10102, 10107..10133, 10137..1013F	57	L2/01-149	N2327	Anderson, Deborah; Everson, Michael (2001-04-03), Revised proposal to encode Aegean scripts in the UCS
4.0	U+10100..10102, 10107..10133, 10137..1013F	57	L2/01-217		Anderson, Deborah (2001-05-20), Status Report on Aegean Script Proposal (Linear B, Aegean Numbers and Cypriot Syllabary)
4.0	U+10100..10102, 10107..10133, 10137..1013F	57	L2/01-184R		Moore, Lisa (2001-06-18), "Motion 87-M4", Minutes from the UTC/L2 meeting
4.0	U+10100..10102, 10107..10133, 10137..1013F	57	L2/01-370	N2378	Anderson, Deborah; Everson, Michael (2001-10-03), Final proposal to encode Aegean scripts in the UCS
4.0	U+10100..10102, 10107..10133, 10137..1013F	57	L2/02-154	N2403	Umamaheswaran, V. S. (2002-04-22), "Resolution M41.8", Draft minutes of WG 2 meeting 41, Hotel Phoenix, Singapore, 2001-10-15/19
4.0	U+10100..10102, 10107..10133, 10137..1013F	57	L2/02-160		Anderson, Deborah (2002-04-27), Status Report on Aegean Script Proposal and the Submission by the Thesaurus Linguae Graecae (TLG)
4.0	U+10100..10102, 10107..10133, 10137..1013F	57	L2/02-191		Anderson, Deborah (2002-05-01), Aegean Script Proposal [notes]
4.0	U+10100..10102, 10107..10133, 10137..1013F	57	L2/02-207	N2455	Anderson, Deborah; McGowan, Rick (2002-05-09), Request for changes in Aegean Scripts
4.0	U+10100..10102, 10107..10133, 10137..1013F	57	L2/11-261R2		Moore, Lisa (2011-08-16), "Consensus 128-C6", UTC #128 / L2 #225 Minutes, "Change the general category from "So" to "Po" ... [U+10102]"
