= Idalion Tablet =

5th-century BC tablet from Cyprus

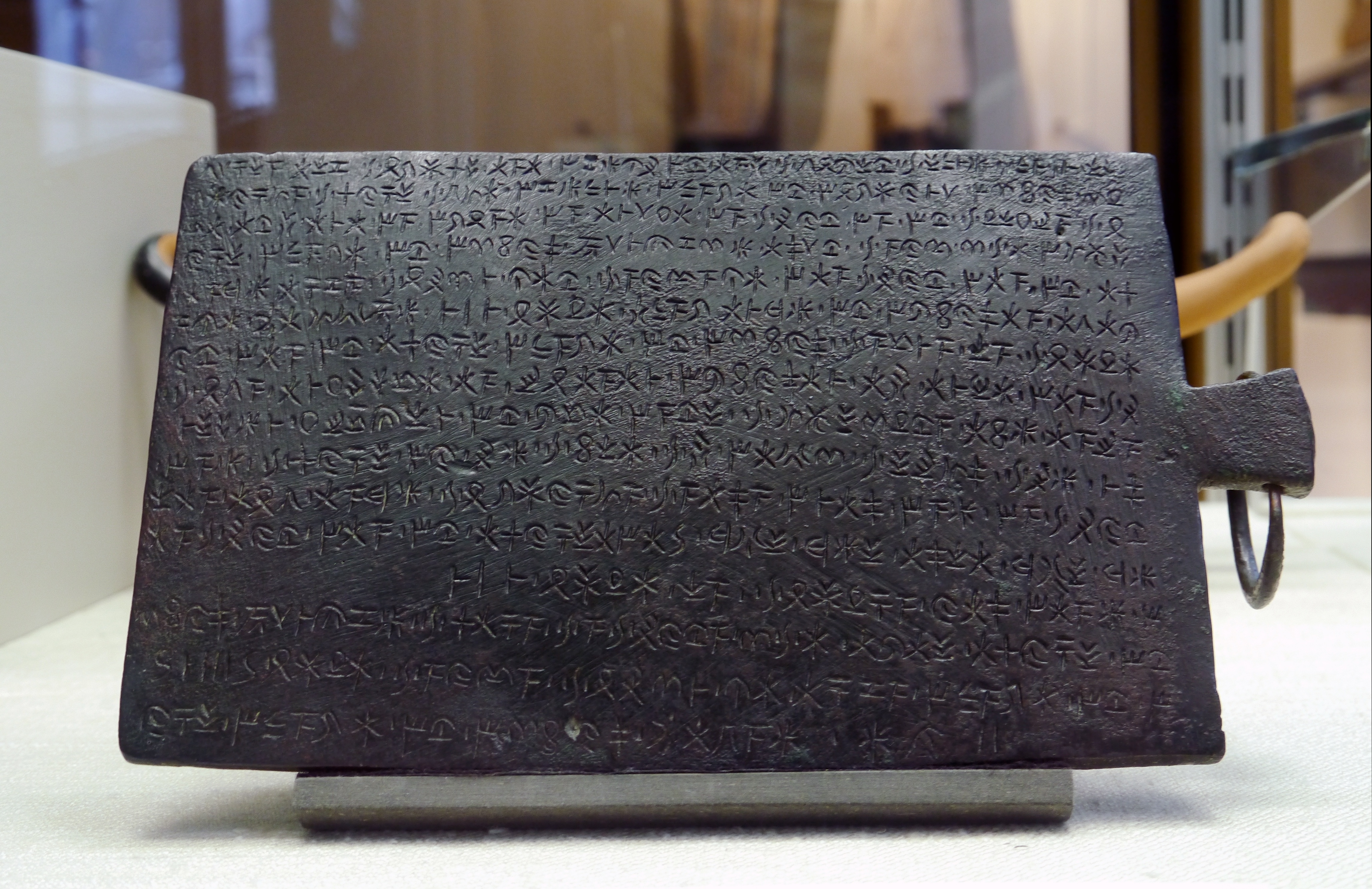
Idalion Tablet, 5th century BC

The Idalion Tablet is a 5th-century BC bronze tablet from Idalion (Greek: Ιδάλιον), Cyprus. The script of the tablet is in the Cypriot syllabary and the inscription itself is in the Arcadocypriot dialect of Greek.

The tablet was kept in the ancient official depository of the temple of Athena on the western acropolis of Idalion, where it was discovered in 1850 by a farmer from the village of Dali. It was purchased by Honoré Théodoric d'Albert de Luynes, who donated it to the Bibliothèque nationale de France in 1862. Today it is kept in the BnF Museum in Paris. The script was not deciphered until after the 1870 discovery of the Idalion bilingual.

It is of exceptional importance for the history of the Cypriot kingdoms. It is engraved on both sides with a long inscription recording a contract entered into by 'the king and the city' and gives a reward to a family of physicians who provided free health services for the casualties when the city was besieged by the Persians and the Kitians in 478–470 BC. It gave historians information about the political system and socio-economic conditions during the war. The joint decision by the king and citizens shows the democratic nature of the city, similar to Greek models. It also tells of the earliest known social welfare system. The tablet is often considered as the earliest sample of an insurance contract since it encompasses some of the major characteristics of modern insurance contracts

== Cypriot syllabary and Greek ==
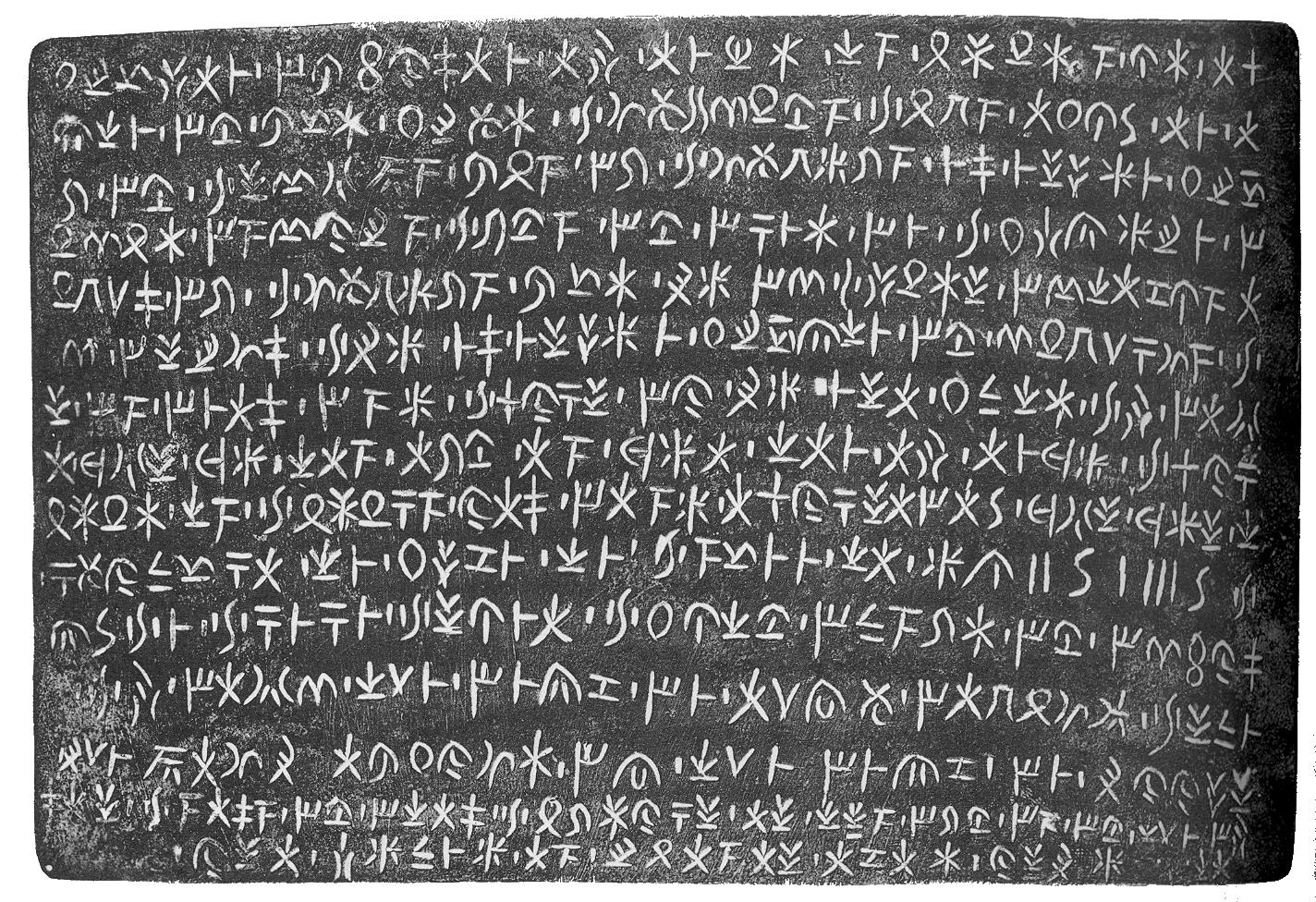
Line drawing of inscription, face B.

Approximately two lines of the text (to be read from right to left) state as follows:

…they ordered Onasilon the (son) of Onasikupron the physician and the brothers to heal the men those in the battle wounded without fee.

Below is the Greek translation, associated with the Cypriot characters. Face A, line 3 starts with Cypriot character ro 𐠦 (looks like a 'loop of rope, open end down'; the loop is the character's top half), and line 4 starts with Cypriot ma 𐠔 (an 'X', with a small upside-down-karat in the top crux):

...anógon-(a-no-ko-ne) Onasilon-(o-na-si-lo-ne) ton Onasikuprón-(to-no-na-si-ku-po-(Line 3)ro-ne) ton iatéran-(to-ni-ja-te-ra-ne) kas-(ka-se) tos-(to-se) kasignétos-(ka-si-ke-ne-to-se) iasthai-(i-ja-sa-ta-i) tos-(to-se) (=men)a(n)thrópos-(a-to-ro-po-se) tos-(to-se) i(n) tái-(i-ta-i) makhái-(ma-ka-i) ikmamenos-(i-ki-(Line 4)ma-me-no-se) aneu-(a-ne-u) misthón-(mi-si-to-ne)...
