= Cypriot Syllabary (Unicode block) =

- Range: U+10800..U+1083F (64 code points)
- Plane: SMP
- Scripts: Cypriot
- Major alphabets: Cypriot Greek
- Assigned: 55 code points
- Unused: 9 reserved code points

Unicode version history
- 4.0 (2003): 55 (+55)

Unicode documentation
- Code chart ∣ Web page

Cypriot Syllabary is the Unicode block encoding the Cypriot syllabary, a writing system for Greek used in Cyprus from the 9th-3rd centuries BCE.

Cypriot Syllabary^{[1]}^{[2]} Official Unicode Consortium code chart (PDF)
	0	1	2	3	4	5	6	7	8	9	A	B	C	D	E	F
U+1080x	𐠀	𐠁	𐠂	𐠃	𐠄	𐠅			𐠈		𐠊	𐠋	𐠌	𐠍	𐠎	𐠏
U+1081x	𐠐	𐠑	𐠒	𐠓	𐠔	𐠕	𐠖	𐠗	𐠘	𐠙	𐠚	𐠛	𐠜	𐠝	𐠞	𐠟
U+1082x	𐠠	𐠡	𐠢	𐠣	𐠤	𐠥	𐠦	𐠧	𐠨	𐠩	𐠪	𐠫	𐠬	𐠭	𐠮	𐠯
U+1083x	𐠰	𐠱	𐠲	𐠳	𐠴	𐠵		𐠷	𐠸				𐠼			𐠿
Notes: 1. As of Unicode version 16.0; 2. Grey areas indicate non-assigned code points

== History ==
The following Unicode-related documents record the purpose and process of defining specific characters in the Cypriot Syllabary block:

Version	Final code points (Note: Proposed code points and characters names may differ from final code points and names)	Count	L2 ID	WG2 ID	Document
4.0	U+10800..10805, 10808, 1080A..10835, 10837..10838, 1083C, 1083F	55	L2/97-105	N1575	Jenkins, John H. (1997-05-21), Overview of the Aegean scripts
4.0	U+10800..10805, 10808, 1080A..10835, 10837..10838, 1083C, 1083F	55	L2/97-108		Jenkins, John H. (1997-05-22), Proposal to add Cypriot Syllabary to ISO/IEC 10646
4.0	U+10800..10805, 10808, 1080A..10835, 10837..10838, 1083C, 1083F	55	L2/97-288	N1603	Umamaheswaran, V. S. (1997-10-24), "8.24.1", Unconfirmed Meeting Minutes, WG 2 Meeting # 33, Heraklion, Crete, Greece, 20 June – 4 July 1997
4.0	U+10800..10805, 10808, 1080A..10835, 10837..10838, 1083C, 1083F	55	L2/00-128		Bunz, Carl-Martin (2000-03-01), Scripts from the Past in Future Versions of Unicode
4.0	U+10800..10805, 10808, 1080A..10835, 10837..10838, 1083C, 1083F	55	L2/01-084		Anderson, Deborah (2001-01-28), Status Report on Aegean Script Proposal (Linear B, Aegean Numbers and Cypriot Syllabary)
4.0	U+10800..10805, 10808, 1080A..10835, 10837..10838, 1083C, 1083F	55	L2/01-149	N2327	Anderson, Deborah; Everson, Michael (2001-04-03), Revised proposal to encode Aegean scripts in the UCS
4.0	U+10800..10805, 10808, 1080A..10835, 10837..10838, 1083C, 1083F	55	L2/01-217		Anderson, Deborah (2001-05-20), Status Report on Aegean Script Proposal (Linear B, Aegean Numbers and Cypriot Syllabary)
4.0	U+10800..10805, 10808, 1080A..10835, 10837..10838, 1083C, 1083F	55	L2/01-184R		Moore, Lisa (2001-06-18), "Motion 87-M4", Minutes from the UTC/L2 meeting
4.0	U+10800..10805, 10808, 1080A..10835, 10837..10838, 1083C, 1083F	55	L2/01-370	N2378	Anderson, Deborah; Everson, Michael (2001-10-03), Final proposal to encode Aegean scripts in the UCS
4.0	U+10800..10805, 10808, 1080A..10835, 10837..10838, 1083C, 1083F	55	L2/02-154	N2403	Umamaheswaran, V. S. (2002-04-22), "Resolution M41.8", Draft minutes of WG 2 meeting 41, Hotel Phoenix, Singapore, 2001-10-15/19
