= Robert Hamilton Lang =

Scottish financier and diplomat (1832–1913)

Sir Robert Hamilton Lang, KCMG (1832–1913) was a Scottish-born financier, diplomat and collector of antiquities.

== Early life and family ==
A son of the Rev. Gavin Lang, parish minister at Glassford, Lanarkshire, Robert Hamilton Lang was born in Glassford manse in 1832, one of eleven siblings. Apart from his father having been a Church of Scotland minister, Robert Hamilton Lang's younger brother, the Very Rev Dr John Marshall Lang (1834-1909) was a Church of Scotland minister, a Moderator of its General Assembly (1893–94) and Principal of the University of Aberdeen (1900-09.) Robert Hamilton Lang's nephew (third son of son of John Marshall Lang), Cosmo Gordon Lang was to become Archbishop of York (1909-1928) and latterly, Archbishop of Canterbury from 1928 to 1942. Another nephew (the Very Rev. Marshall Buchanan Lang, fifth son of John Marshall Lang) was to be appointed Moderator of the General Assembly of the Church of Scotland, 1935–36.

He received his schooling at the famous Hamilton Academy from which he entered the University of Glasgow. Following graduation, Lang entered business and after a period posted in Beirut, was sent to Cyprus in 1861.

== Career ==
In 1863 Lang was appointed manager of the Imperial Ottoman Bank in Larnaca.

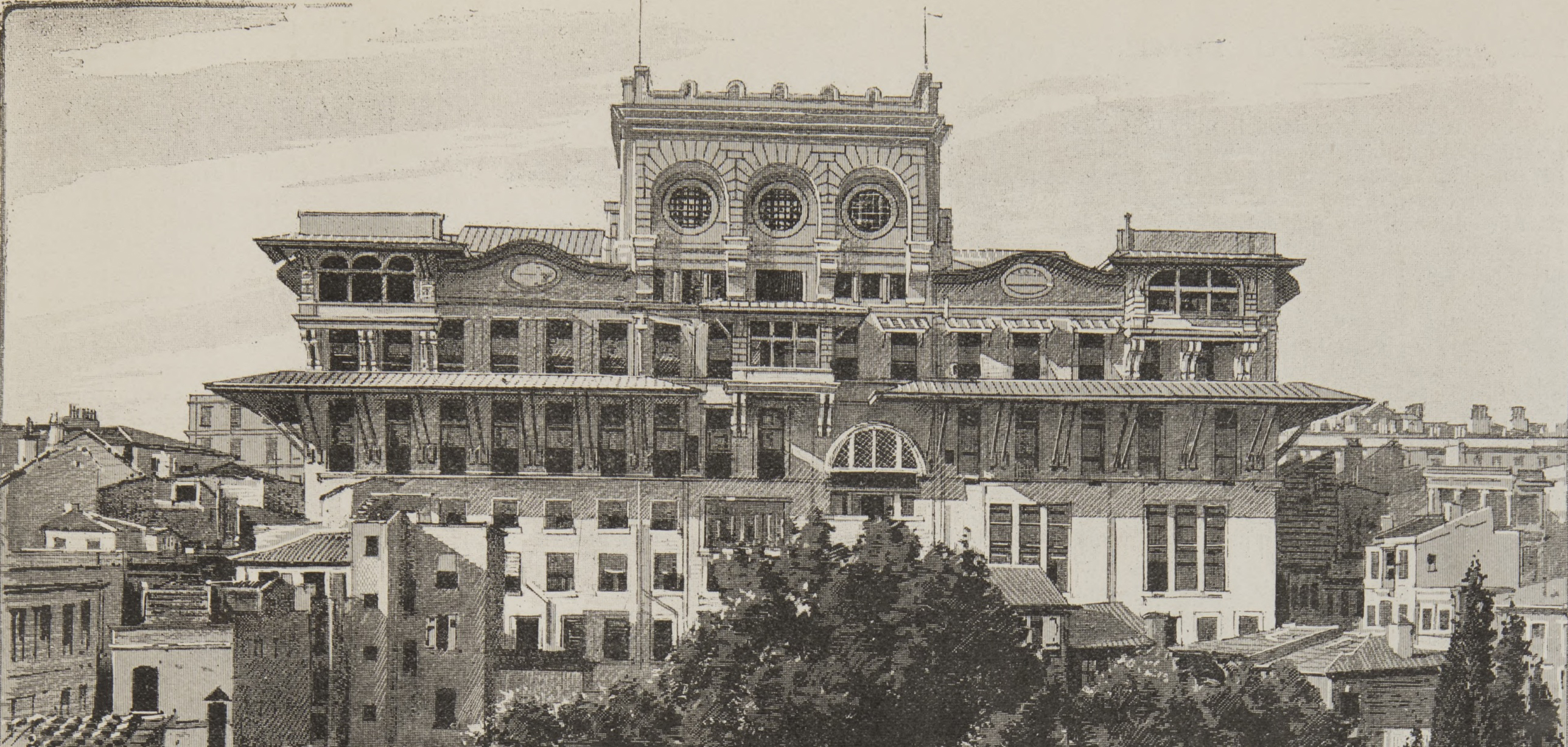
Imperial Ottoman Bank headquarters, Constantinople, 1896

During his time in Cyprus, Lang also served as Acting Vice-Consul of Cyprus and as full Consul from 1871 'till his departure for Cairo in 1872, to run the bank's operations there. In 1875 Lang was appointed a director of the Imperial Ottoman Bank at Constantinople.

Lang was later appointed Director General of the Imperial Ottoman Bank, based in Constantinople, and was appointed a Knight Commander of the Order of St Michael and St George (KCMG) in 1886. He retired in October 1902, when he was received by the Sultan who conferred upon him the Grand Cordon of the Order of Medjidie set in brilliants. Following his resignation, he moved back to Britain and settled in Dedham, Essex.

== Excavations and collections ==
During his time on Cyprus Lang began acquiring antiquities, this leading to his own excavations around the villages of Dhali, in particular the site of ancient Idalion, and Pyla. In 1870 Lang loaned a collection of his Cypriot antiquities to the Kelvingrove Museum, Glasgow (subsequently donating this collection to the new Kelvingrove Art Gallery and Museum in 1903) and in 1872, the British Museum purchased a major part of his remaining collection, with other parts going to the Louvre in Paris and to museums in Berlin.

Lang wrote an account of his excavations at the Idalion site, this published in the Transactions of the Royal Society of Literature (second series, volume 11, 1878), and a further account of his archaeological excavations in Cyprus in Blackwood's Edinburgh Magazine (1905.) (Lang also wrote the book Cyprus: its history, its present resources, and future prospects (Macmillan & Co., 1878) based on his evaluation of the economic potential of the island.)

== Later life and family ==
Hamilton Lang married and had children.

- His daughter Anna Hamilton Lang married in Dedham in 1903 Rev Richard de Crespigny Thelwall, Vicar of Burbage, Wiltshire, and had children.
- Another daughter Mary Alice Lang married in New York in 1911 Byron Demont Rogers, of the US Navy, whose father had also been a Director General of the Imperial Ottoman Bank in Constantinople.

Ill health precluded his attendance at the marriage of his second daughter (Mary Alice Lang) in New York in 1911 and he died at Hampstead, London, in 1913.

== Publications ==
- On coins discovered during recent excavations in the island of Cyprus. The Numismatic Chronicle and Journal of the Numismatic Society New Series, Vol. 11 (1871), 1-18.
- Cyprus: its history, its present resources, and future prospects. Macmillan. 1878.
- Narrative of Excavations in a Temple at Dali (Idalium) in Cyprus. Transactions of the Royal Society of Literature, 2nd ser. 11, 30–71. 1878.
- Colonial and Indian Exhibition 1886. Handbook to Cyprus (with map of island) and catalogue of the exhibits, London. 1886.
- Report (with three woodcuts) upon the results of the Cyprus representation at the Colonial & Indian Exhibition of 1886. London. 1886
- Roumelian coup d'état, Servo-Bulgarian war, and the latest phase of the Eastern question. London: Harrison and Sons, 59, Pall Mall, S.W. 1886.
- On Archaic Survivals in Cyprus. The Journal of the Anthropological Institute of Great Britain and Ireland, Vol. 16 (1887), 186–188.
- Reminiscences - archaeological research in Cyprus. Blackwood's Edinburgh Magazine, 177:1075, 622–639. 1905.

== Collections ==
- Cypriot collection in the British Museum
