= Philippa M. Steele =

Classical scholar and linguist

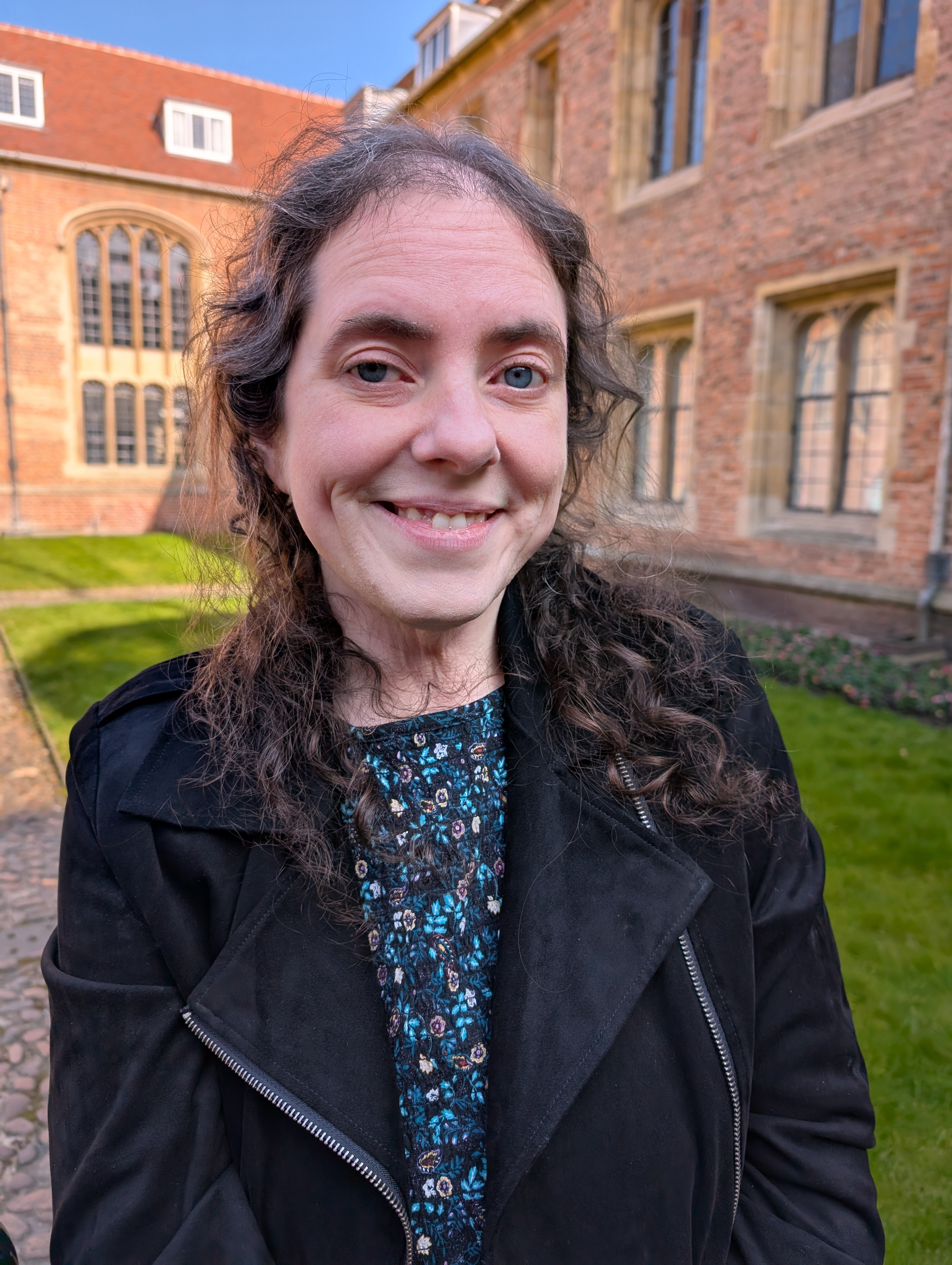
- Occupations: Classicist, specialist in ancient writing systems

Academic background
- Education: University of Cambridge

Academic work
- Discipline: Classics
- Sub-discipline: Ancient writing systems
- Institutions: University of Cambridge

Philippa (Pippa) M. Steele is a classical scholar and linguist. She was a Director of Studies at Wolfson College, University of Cambridge and is a Senior Research Fellow at Magdalene College, University of Cambridge. Her research focuses on ancient Cypriot and Aegean languages, and the writing systems in the ancient Mediterranean.

== Academic career ==
Philippa Steele studied for her BA, MPhil and PhD at the Faculty of Classics, University of Cambridge. Her 2011 PhD thesis, A linguistic history of Cyprus: the non-Greek languages, and their relations with Greek, c. 1600-300 BC, was awarded the Hare Prize, and published as a monograph by Cambridge University Press in 2013.

In 2010, she became a junior research fellow at Magdalene College, University of Cambridge before gaining a British Academy Postdoctoral Fellowship in 2012. In 2014, she was Evans-Pritchard Lecturer at All Souls College, University of Oxford. She has been the recipient of two ERC grants for projects on ancient writing systems. Between 2016 and 2021 she was the director of the five-year ERC funded project Contexts and Relations between Early Writing Systems (CREWS) at the Faculty of Classics, University of Cambridge. Here she worked alongside other notable classical philologists such as Dr Willemijn Waal from Leiden University. She is currently the principal investigator of the Visual Interactions in Early Writing Systems (VIEWS) project, also at the Faculty of Classics, University of Cambridge.

== Public engagement ==
Philippa Steele received the Arts and Humanities Impact Fund Award in 2020 in order to produce free teaching resources for the study of ancient writing systems. She has also spoken about the importance of her pastoral role and experiences as a female academic as the Director of Studies at Magdalene College, University of Cambridge.

== Selected publications ==
- Steele, P. (ed.) (2022). Writing around the Ancient Mediterranean: Practices and Adaptations, co-editor Philip J. Boyes.
- The Social and Cultural Contexts of Historic Writing Practices, Oxford 2021, co-editors Philip J. Boyes and Natalia Elvira Astoreca.
- Steele, P. (2018).Writing and Society in Ancient Cyprus (1st ed.). Cambridge: Cambridge University Press.
- Steele, P. (2017). Understanding Relations Between Scripts: The Aegean Writing Systems (1st ed.). United Kingdom: Oxbow Books.
- Steele, P. (2013). A Linguistic History of Ancient Cyprus: The Non-Greek Languages, and their Relations with Greek, c. 1600-300 BC . Cambridge: Cambridge University Press. ISBN 9781107337558
