= Idalion =

Ancient city-kingdom of Cyprus

- Ιδάλιον (Greek)
- Map showing the ancient city-kingdoms of Cyprus; Idalion is inland at center right

- Location within Cyprus
- 35°00′57″N 33°25′23″E
- Location: Cyprus
- Region: Nicosia District

Site notes
- Archaeologists: Luigi Palma di Cesnola, R. Hamilton Lang, Max Ohnefalsch-Richter, Erik Sjöqvist
- Management: Cyprus Department of Antiquities

Idalion or Idalium (Greek: Ιδάλιον, Idalion, Phoenician: 𐤀𐤃𐤉𐤋, ʾdyl, Akkadian: e-di-ʾi-il, Edīl) was an ancient city-kingdom of Cyprus, in modern Dali, Nicosia District. The city was founded on the copper trade in the 3rd millennium BC. Its name does not appear on the Sargon Stele of 707 BC, but does appear on the later Prism of Esarhaddon (copies of the text dated to 673–672 BC) and in similar spellings in Ashurbanipal's annal (648/647 BC).

Recent excavations have uncovered major buildings on the site which are open to visitors. A new museum is at the entrance of the site.

== Name ==
According to the ancient tradition, an oracle instructed King Chalcenor to found a city at the spot where he would behold the rising sun. As one of his companions was surveying the region, he said, "Look, my king, there is the sun." From this utterance, namely ἴδ᾽ ἅλιον ("look, the sun"), the city is said to have derived its name, Ιδάλιον.

== History ==
=== The ancient city ===
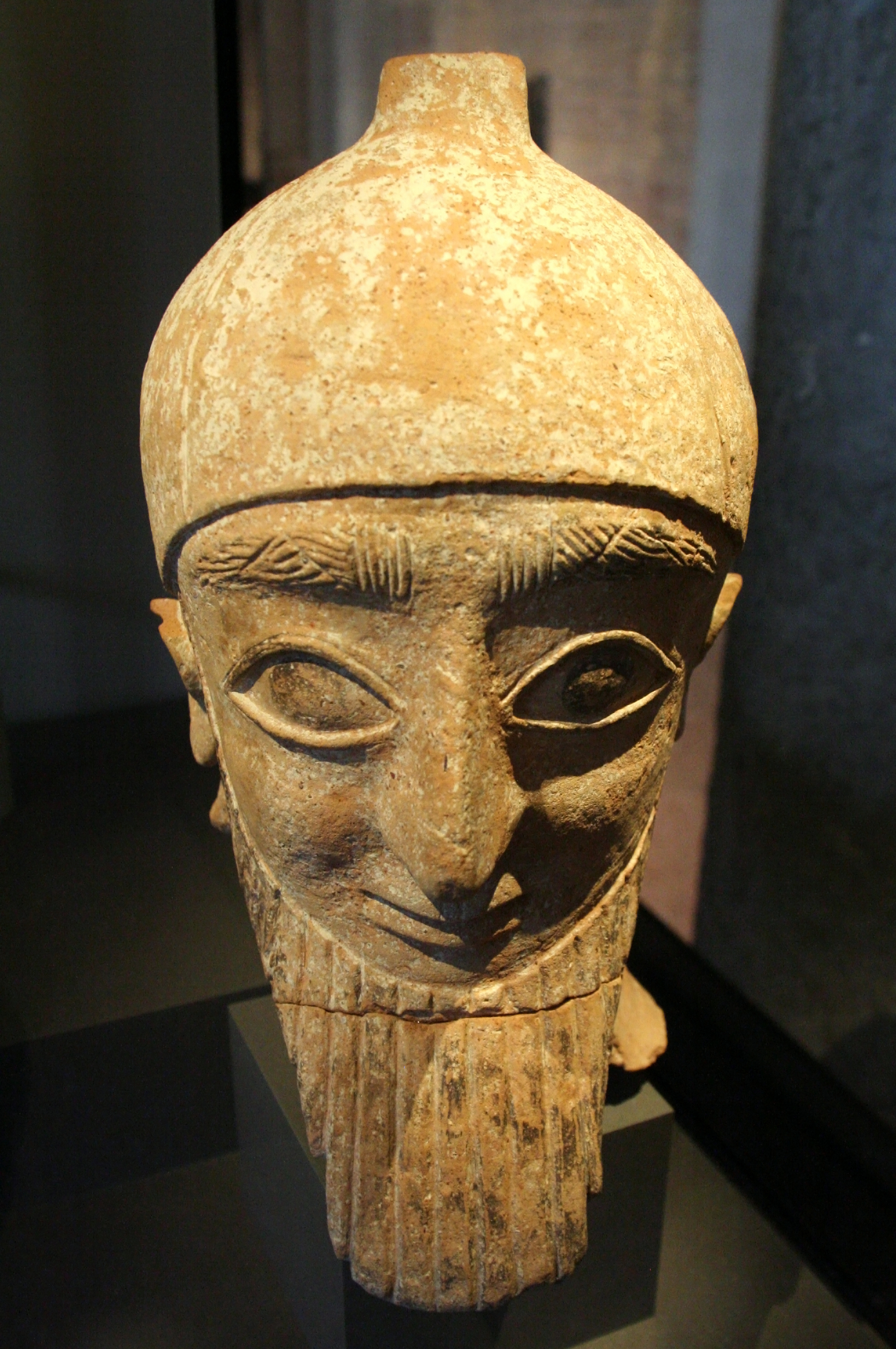
Terracotta statue from Idalion, 7th or 6th century BC. S.A.L. Neues Museum, Berlin

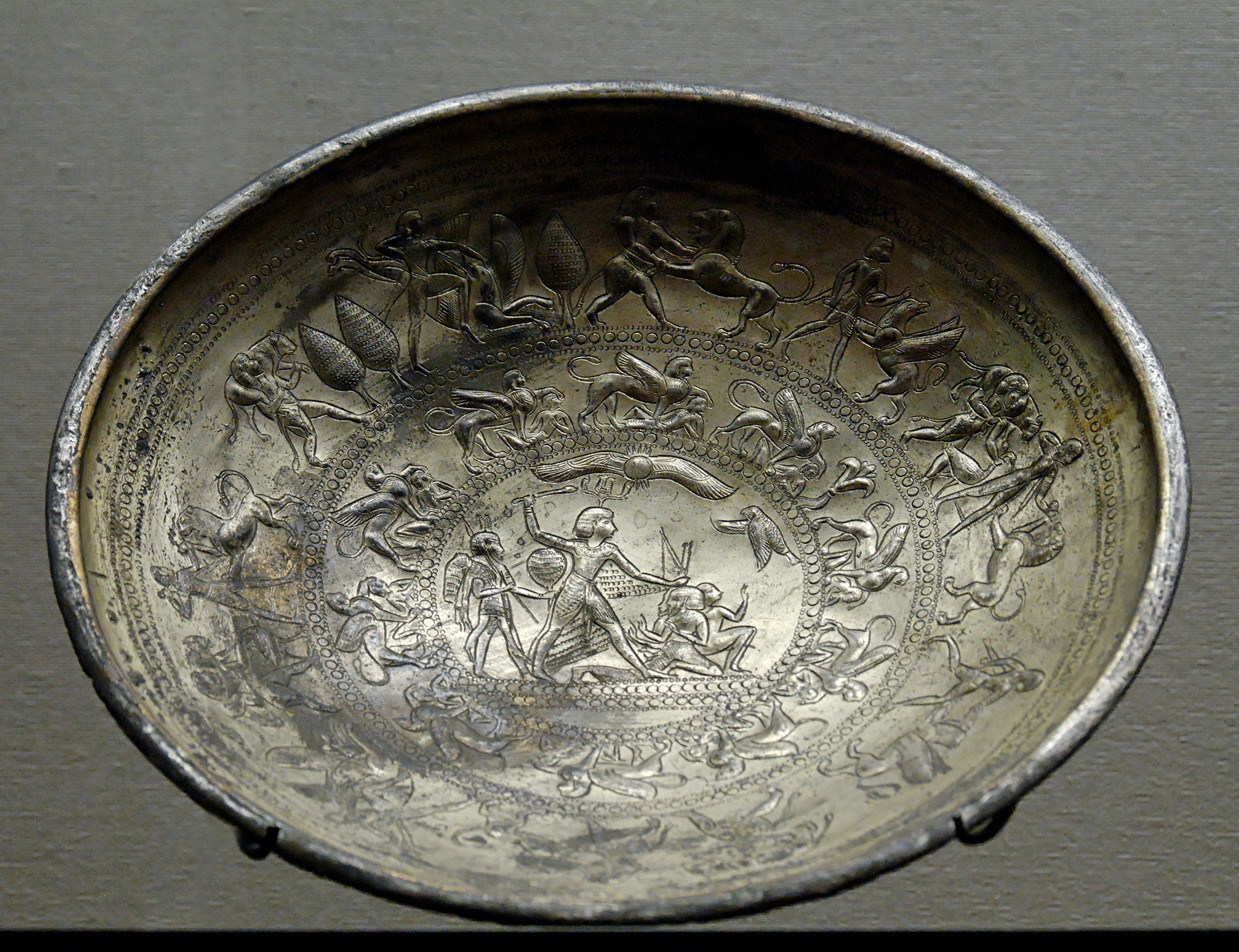
Idalion, Cup with mythological scenes, a sphinx frieze and the representation of a king vanquishing his enemies. Electrum, Cypro-Archaic I (8th–7th centuries BC). Louvre Museum

The original inhabitants were natives of the island, known to scholars as the "Eteocypriots". The original city lay on the northern side of the Gialias River in modern "Ayios Sozomenos". During the 13th century BC the people of Ed-di-al began manufacturing operations on the south side of the river in what is now modern Dali. From there the city grew to the major urban and copper-trading centre founded by the Neo-Assyrians at the end of the 8th century BC.

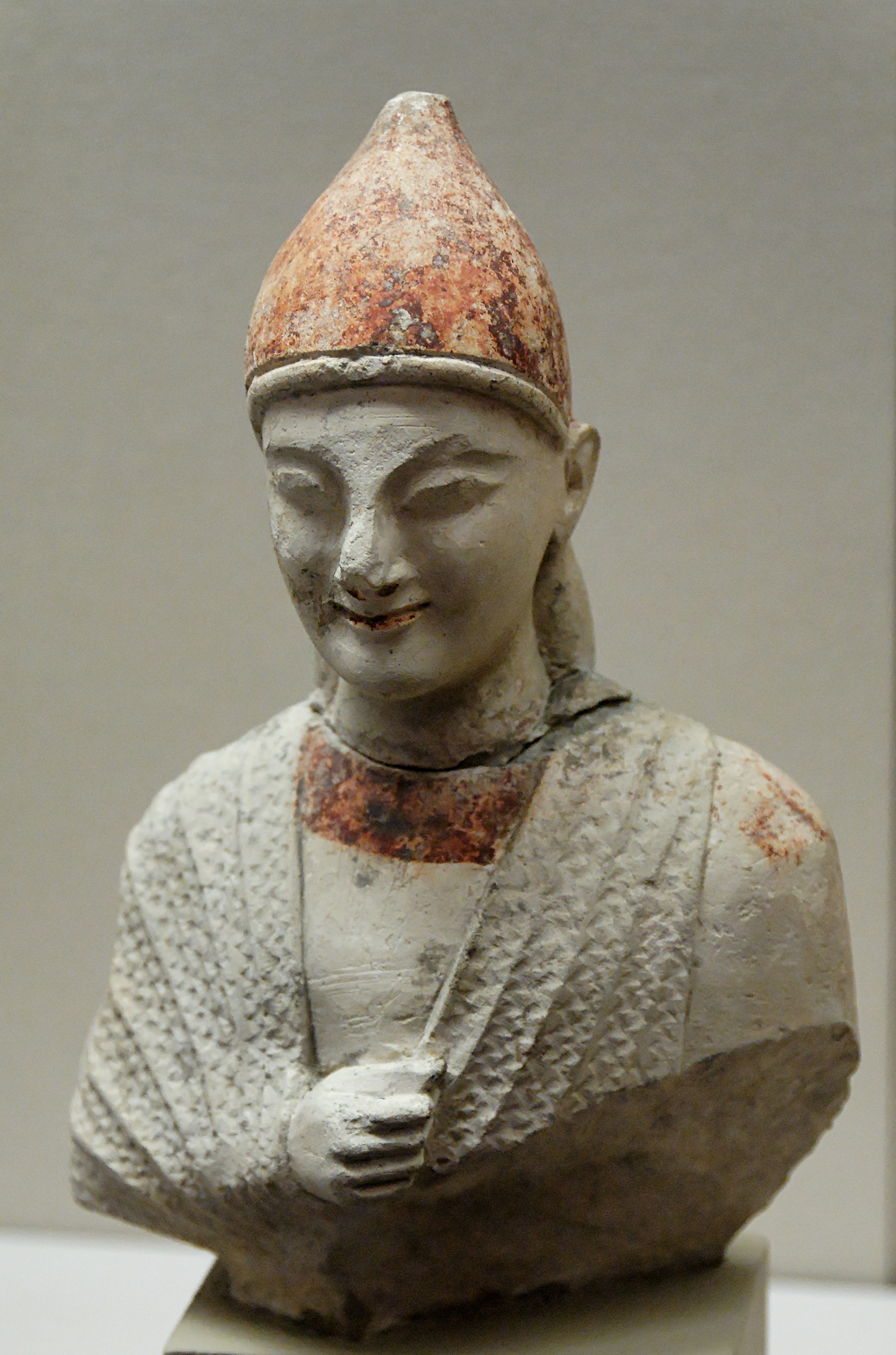
Young man from Idalion, Cypro-Archaic II (middle of the 6th century), Louvre

The city was the centre of the worship of the Great Goddess of Cyprus, the "Wanassa" or Queen of Heaven, known as Aphrodite and her consort the "Master of Animals". This worship appears to have begun in the 11th century BC and continued down through the Roman period.

The city was located in the fertile Gialias valley and flourished there as an economic centre due to its location close to the mines in the eastern foothills of the Troodos Mountains and its proximity to the cities and ports on the south and east coast. Idalion prospered and became so wealthy that it was listed as the first among the ten Cypriot kingdoms on the prism (many-sided tablet) of the Assyrian king Esarhaddon (680–669 BC).

The city included two acropolises while houses were in the lower city. The fortified palace was built in 750–600 BC on Ampileri Hill, the west acropolis of the city, and rebuilt in 600–475 BC against attacks by Kition. The Temple of Athena was also located there. The east acropolis on Moutti tou Arvili Hill functioned as a sacred centre and included the temples of Apollo, Aphrodite and other gods. The lower city was also fortified, at least during the 5th century BC.

The first evidence of non-Cypriot presence (Greek, Phoenician, and others) appears in the Archaic Period (c. 550 BC) in Phoenician inscriptions found in the Adonis Temenos on the East Acropolis.

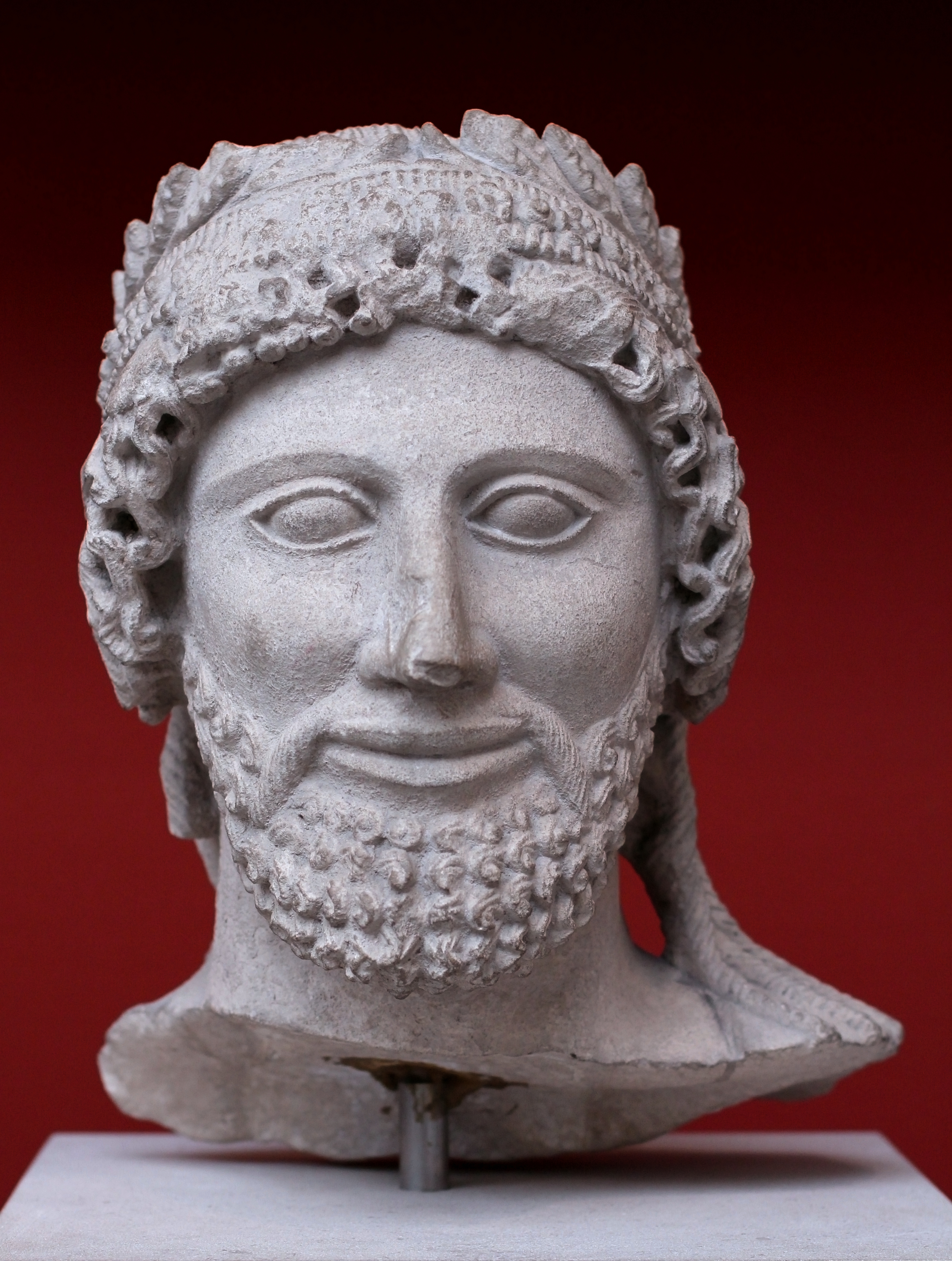
Limestone head of a bearded worshiper, 475 and 450 BC (British Museum)

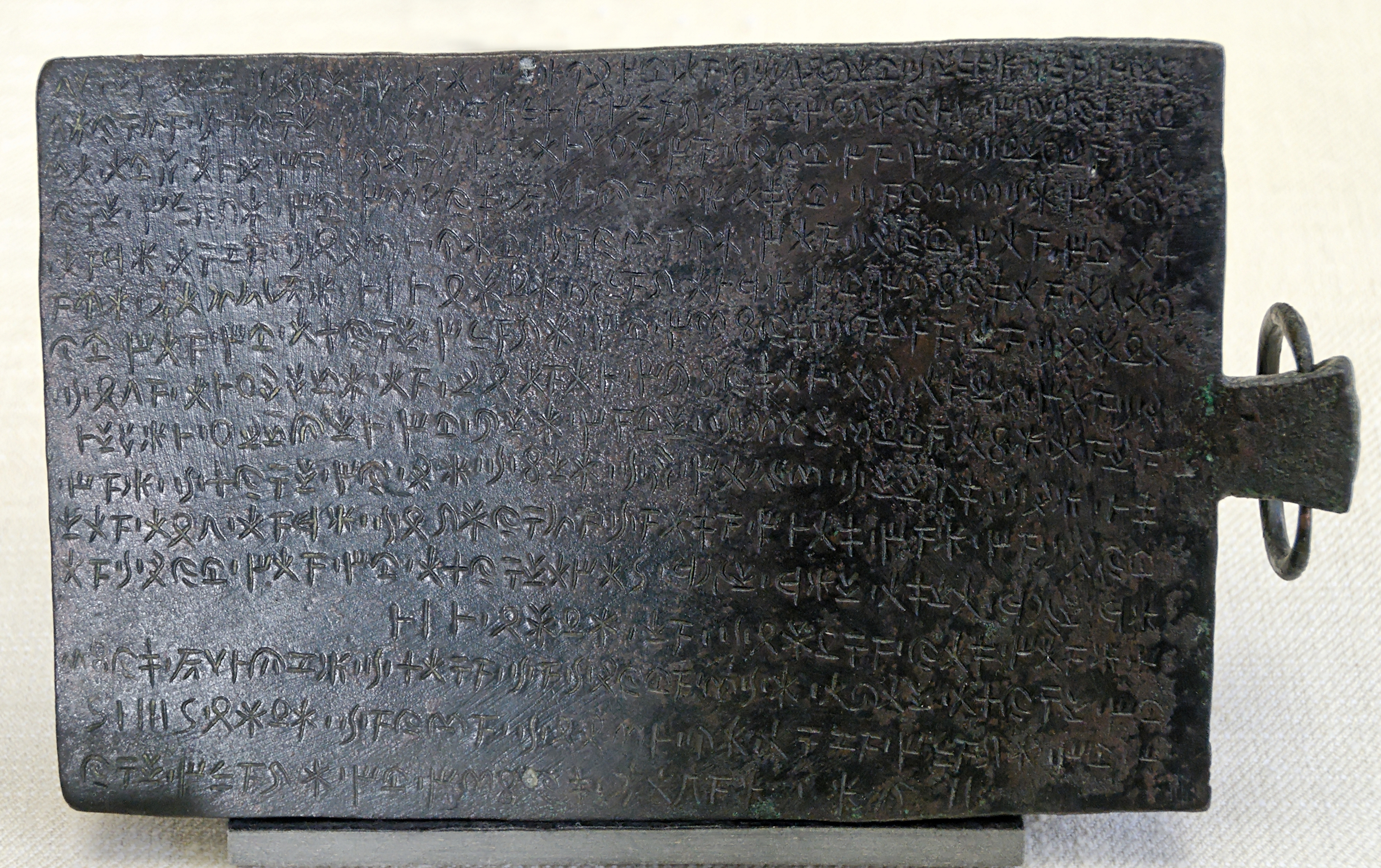
Idalion Tablet, (Cabinet des Médailles, Paris)

Production by the mint dating from 535 BC shows the city's authority and prosperity. The fortified palace was also a sign of this prosperity as it is one of the few, and the largest known, in Cyprus. The first kings of Idalion were Greek as shown from coin inscriptions and the Idalion Tablet. The tablet also shows that the last king, Stakyspros, was democratic in governing by decisions taken with a council of citizens and the resulting documented laws discovered in the temple of Athena. It also shows that there was a social welfare system during the sieges of the city by the Persians and Kitions of 478–470 BC. The king was the biggest landowner and borders of plots were registered.

The city was conquered by Kition, a Phoenician city at the time, c. 450 BC. The palace became their administrative centre; the archive of tax payments was discovered here. Under Kition the city became the centre of a cult of Aphrodite and of the Helleno-Phoenician deity Resheph-Apollo.

From 300 BC the palace and west acropolis were abandoned and the city became centered on the east acropolis, around the special sanctuaries for Aphrodite and Adonis which continued their importance.

The city existed in Hellenistic and Roman times but its extent is not yet known.

"Rosemary scented Idalium" appears in the poetry of Propertius and others as the place where Venus (or Aphrodite, the original pre-Greek Queen of Heaven) met Adonis (the original pre-Greek consort of the Queen of Heaven, or 'Lord').

=== Cypro-Syllabic script ===
Cypro-Syllabic script (11th to 2nd century BC) was deciphered based on the Cypriot-Phoenician bilingual text of Idalion which is now in the British Museum's collection. Starting with the Cypriot-Phoenician bilingual text of Idalion (a dedication to the god Reshef Mikal – identified as Apollo Amyklos – 4th century BC), George Smith carried out a first attempt at interpretation in 1871, later developed and improved, thanks also to the Idalion Tablet, by the Egyptologist Samuel Birch (1872), the numismatist Johannes Brandis (1873), the philologists Moritz Schmidt, Wilhelm Deeke, Justus Siegismund (1874) and the dialectologist H. L. Ahrens (1876).

== Archaeology ==
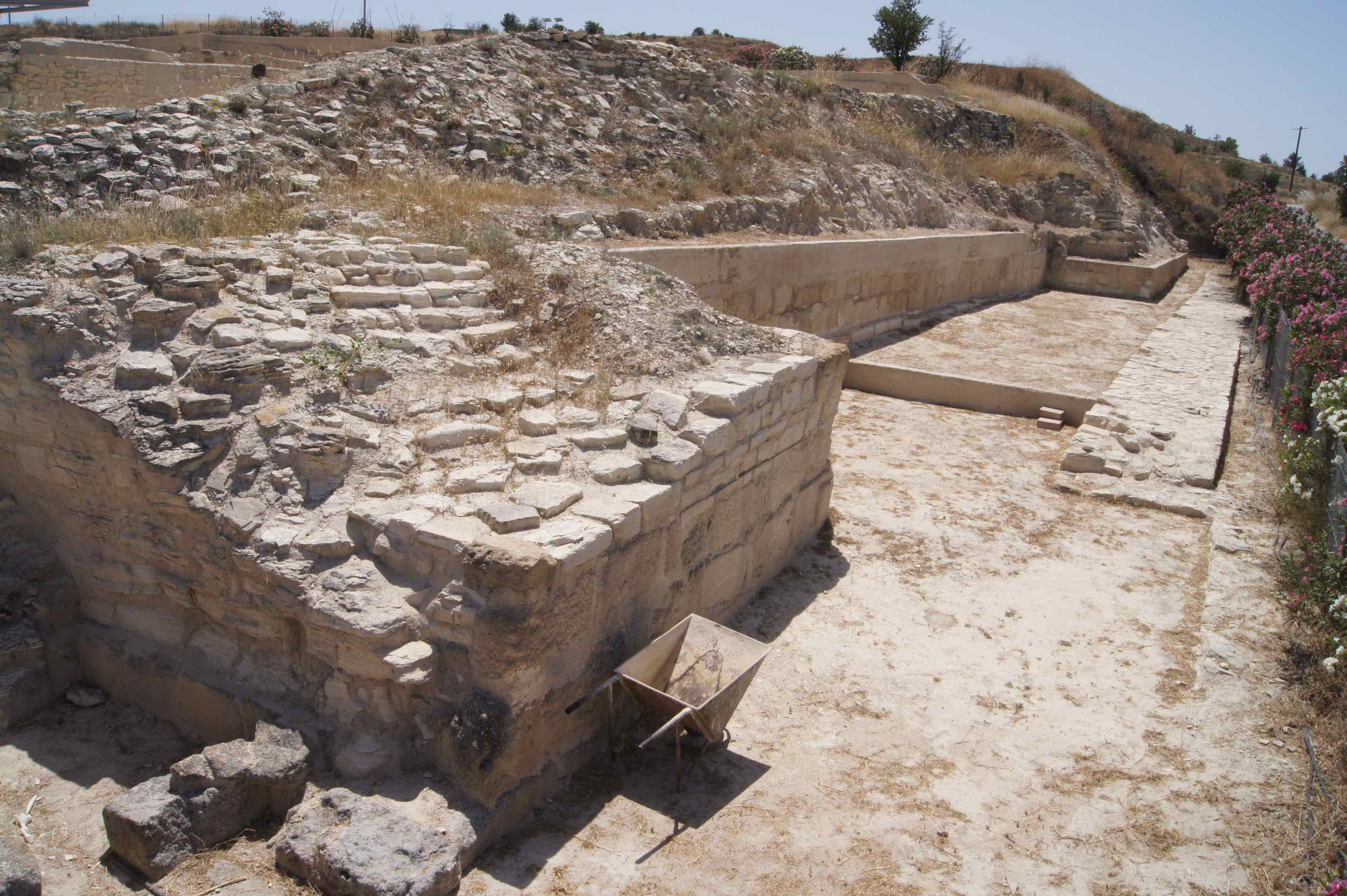
Fortified palace

The first recorded visitor, was Melchior de Vogüé, in 1862. Off and on between 1867 and 1875, Luigi Palma di Cesnola, antiquarian, treasure hunter and American and Russian consul to the Ottoman government of Cyprus dug at Idalion. He claimed to have opened 15,000 tombs. Noting that a structure on the East Acropolis had been uncovered he was informed by locals that they had looted a large number of bronze objects including "Helmets, swords, spear-heads, etc" from there. Three ships were loaded with antiquities, one of which, the Napried, sank in the Mediterranean in 1872, while the others reached New York to help found the Metropolitan Museum of Art.

The western acropolis at Idalion.

In 1868 and 1869 R. Hamilton Lang, the British consul, commissioned local workers to look for antiquities on the East Acropolis (Mouti tou Arvili) later supervising himself. He found an open-air sanctuary of a deity which one Phoenician inscription called "Reshef-Mikal" and a Greek inscription called "Apollo Amyklos". It contained 142 limestone sculptures, now in the British Museum.

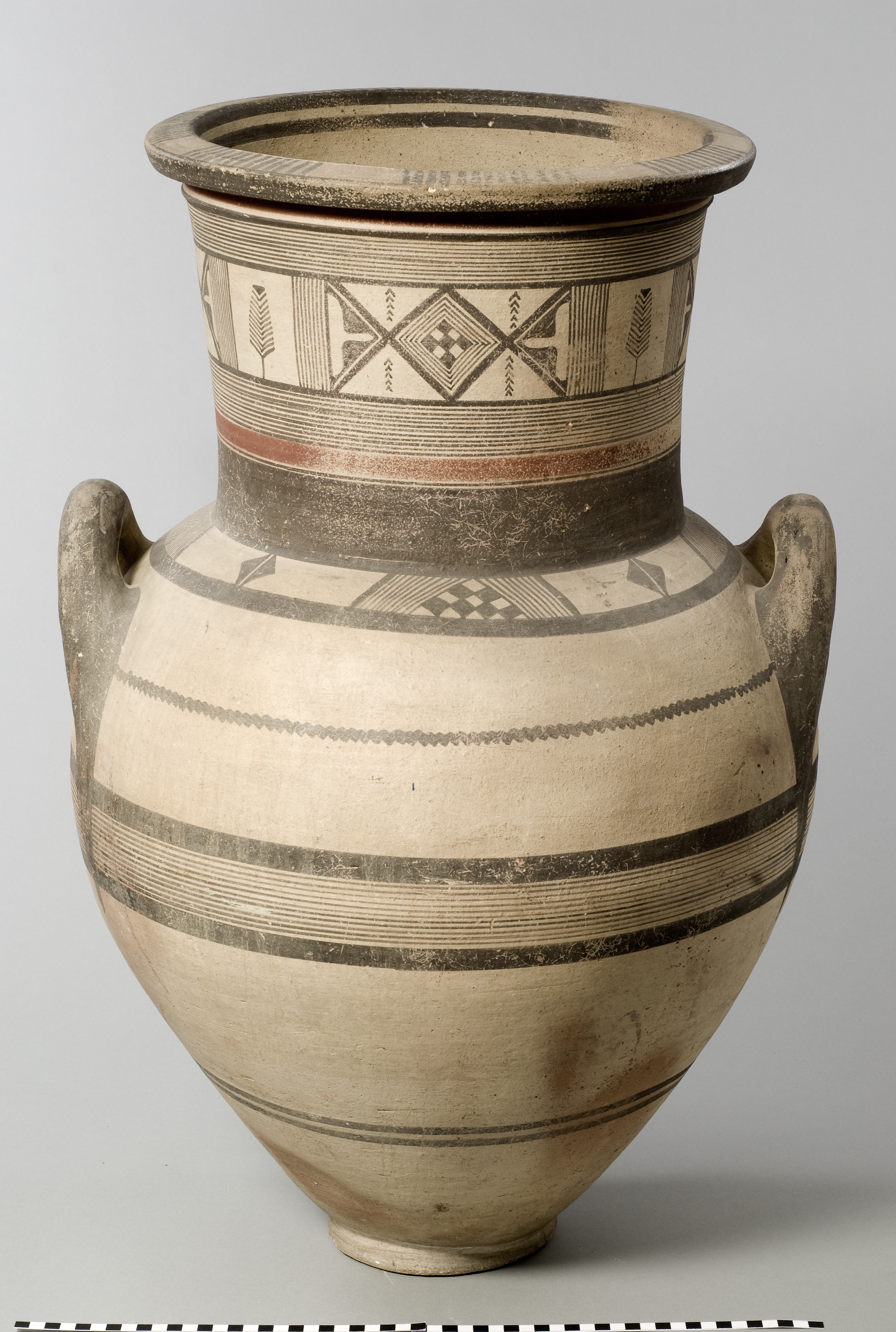
Large Bichrome Amphora from Stylli, ca. 850–700 BC. Can be seen at Medelhavsmuseet, Stockholm.

German archaeologist, Max Ohnefalsch-Richter, dug at the site in 1883 and 1885, occasionally returning to the Idalion in subsequent years. While not a professional archaeologist, being self trained, he used surveys and systematic excavation techniques, unlike his treasure hunting predecessors, locating a number of shrines.

For a few months in 1928, the Swedish Cyprus Expedition, led by Erik Sjöqvist, worked at Idalion. Their primary work was a complete excavation of the upper portion of the West Acropolis (Ambelleri) finding a fortified sanctuary of Anat-Athena. Votive gifts consisting mainly of weapons and tools were found. Personal accessories such as pins, fibulae, earrings, bracelets, and different kinds of pottery. They also made soundings in the surrounding terrace, finding the royal palace of Idalion, and excavated a number of tombs, which ranged in date from the Cypro-Archaic to the Hellenistic periods. They proposed six different building periods for the West Acropolis area. Periods 1–3 were dated to the Late Cypriote III (1200–1050 BC), when the city kingdom of Idalion seems to have been formed. Periods 4–6 were considered to belong from Cypro-Geometric III to Cypro-Archaic II (1050–850 BC).

In 1971 and 1972 Lawrence E. Stager and Anita Walker excavated at Idalion on behalf of the Harvard University. Between 1973 and 1978 and again in 1980 the American Expedition to Idalion worked at the site.

In 1987 a University of New Hampshire under the direction of Pamela Gaber excavated at Idalion. Work, with the same director, continued in 1992 until 2005 under the auspices of the University of Arizona and Lycoming College.

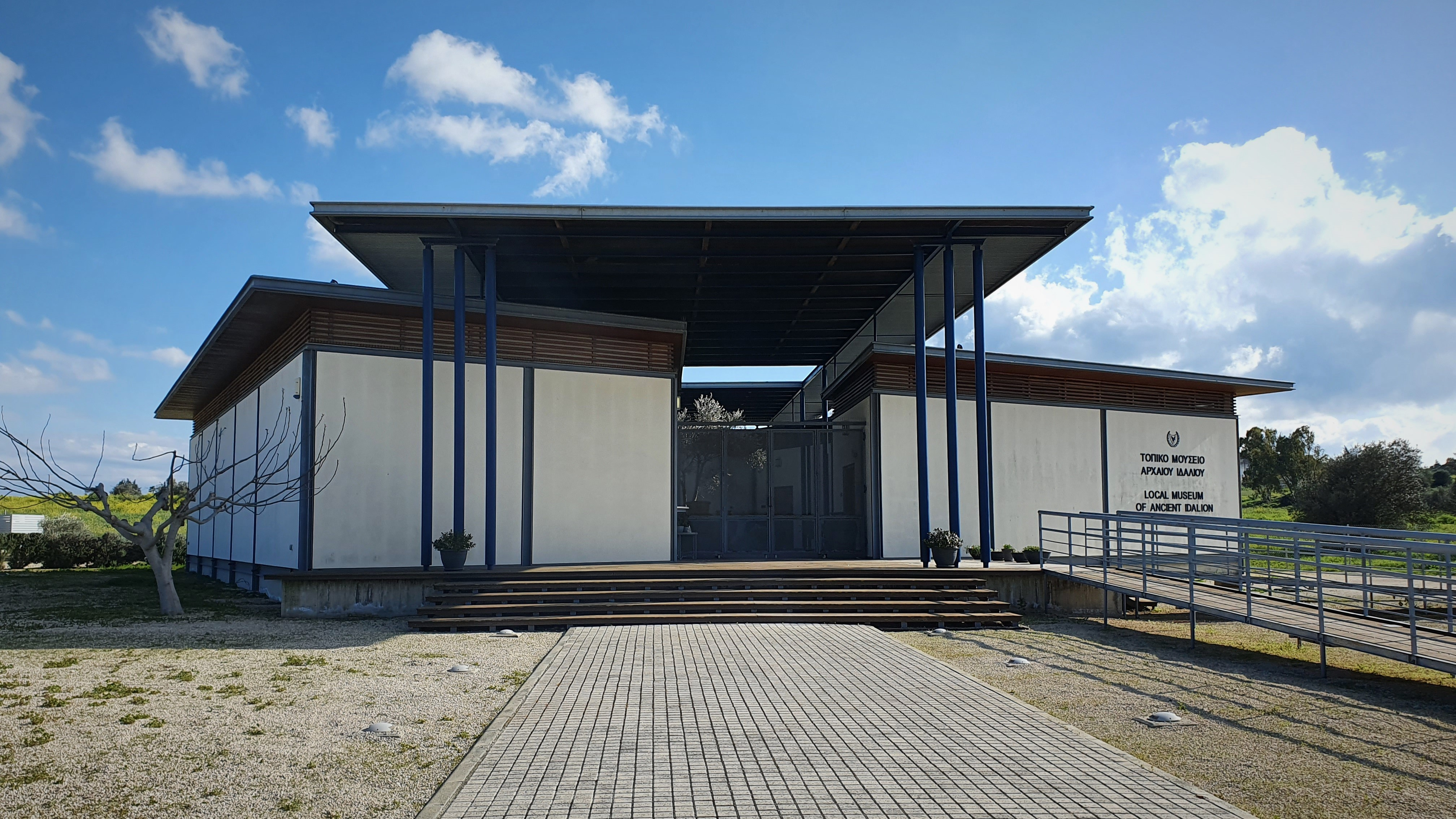
Local Museum of Ancient Idalion

The Idalion Tablet is a 5th-century BC bronze tablet inscribed on both sides was found here. The script of the tablet is in the Cypriot syllabary and the inscription itself is in Greek. The tablet records a contract between "the king and the city" and mentions a reward given to a family of physicians for providing free health services to casualties during the siege of Idalion by the Persians.

North of Idalion is the Nymphaeum of Kafizin, with Cypro-syllabic inscriptions dated to 225–218 BC.

== See also ==
- Cities of the ancient Near East
- Enkomi
- Kition
- Kourion
- List of ancient Greek cities
