= George Smith (Assyriologist) =

British Assyriologist (1840–1876)

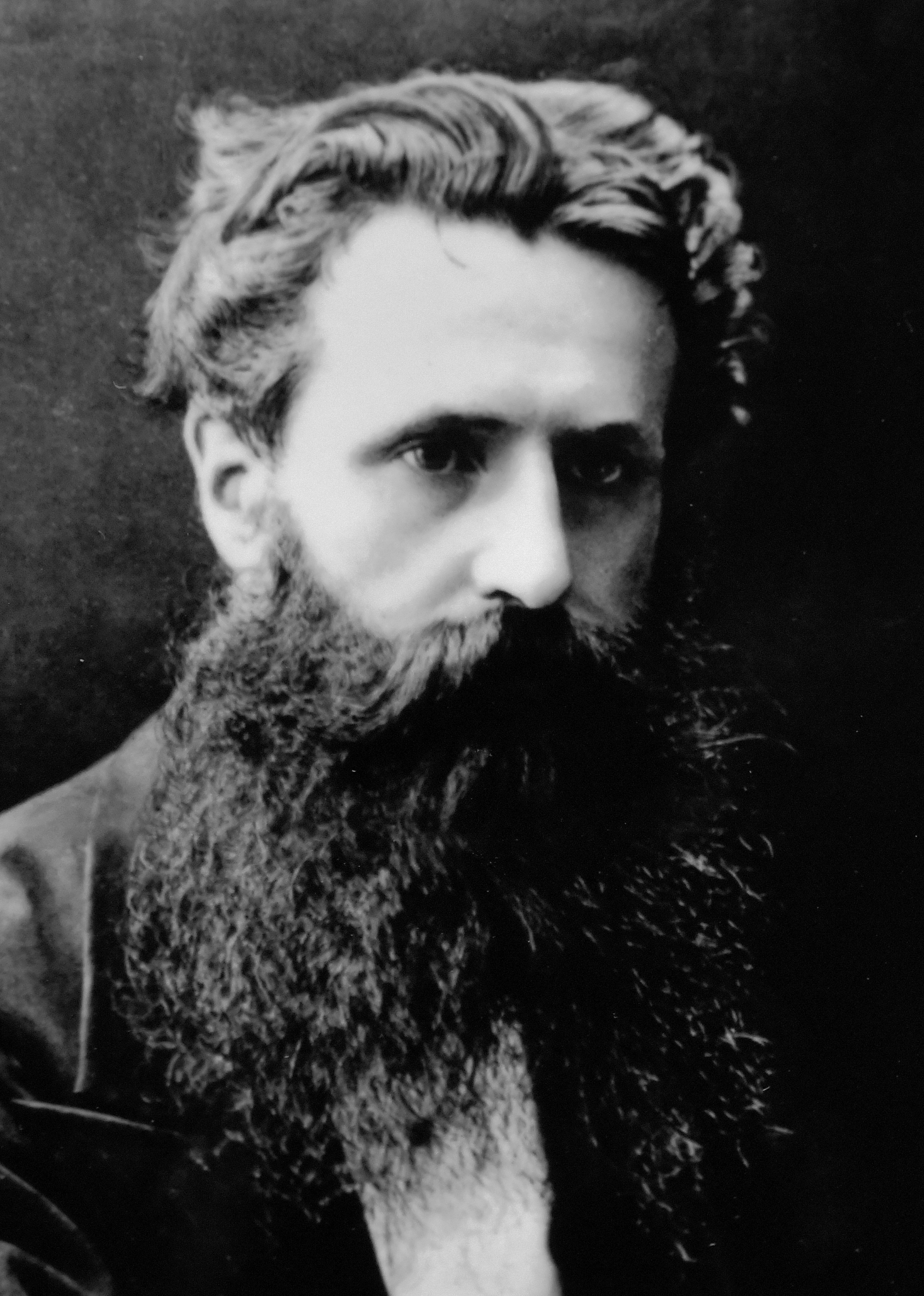
- Born: 26 March 1840; Chelsea, Middlesex, England
- Died: 19 August 1876 (aged 36); Aleppo, Ottoman Empire (today Syria)
- Known for: Discovered and translated the Epic of Gilgamesh
- Scientific career
- Fields: Assyriology
- Workplaces: British Museum

George Smith (26 March 1840 – 19 August 1876) was a pioneering English Assyriologist who first discovered and translated the Epic of Gilgamesh, one of the oldest-known written works of literature.

== Early life and early career ==
As the son of a working-class family in Victorian England, Smith was limited in his ability to acquire a formal education. At age fourteen, he was apprenticed to the London-based publishing house of Bradbury and Evans to learn banknote engraving, at which he excelled. From his youth, he was fascinated with Assyrian culture and history. In his spare time, he read everything that was available to him on the subject. His interest was so keen that while working at the printing firm, he spent his lunch hours at the British Museum, studying publications on the cuneiform tablets that had been unearthed near Mosul in present-day Iraq by Austen Henry Layard, Henry Rawlinson, and Hormuzd Rassam, during the archaeological expeditions of 1840–1855. In 1863 Smith married Mary Clifton (1835–1883), and they had six children.

== British Museum ==
Smith's natural talent for cuneiform studies was first noticed by Samuel Birch, Egyptologist and Director of the Department of Antiquities, who brought the young man to the attention of the renowned Assyriologist Sir Henry Rawlinson. As early as 1861, he was working in the evenings sorting and cleaning the mass of friable fragments of clay cylinders and tablets in the museum's storage rooms. In 1866 Smith made his first important discovery, the date of the payment of the tribute by Jehu, king of Israel, to Shalmaneser III. Sir Henry suggested to the trustees of the museum that Smith should join him in the preparation of the third and fourth volumes of The Cuneiform Inscriptions of Western Asia. Following the death of William H. Coxe in 1869 and with letters of reference from Rawlinson, Layard, William Henry Fox Talbot, and Edwin Norris, Smith was appointed Senior Assistant in the Assyriology Department early in 1870.

== Discovery of inscriptions ==
Smith's earliest successes were the discoveries of two unique inscriptions early in 1867. The first, a total eclipse of the sun in the month of Sivan inscribed on Tablet K51, he linked to the spectacular eclipse that occurred on 15 June 763 BC, a description of which had been published 80 years earlier by French historian François Clément (1714–1793) in L'art de vérifier les dates des faits historiques. This discovery is the cornerstone of ancient Near Eastern chronology. The other was the date of an invasion of Babylonia by the Elamites in 2280 BC.

In 1871, Smith published Annals of Assur-bani-pal, transliterated and translated, and communicated to the newly founded Society of Biblical Archaeology a paper on "The Early History of Babylonia", and an account of his decipherment of the Cypriote inscriptions.

== Epic of Gilgamesh and expedition to Nineveh ==
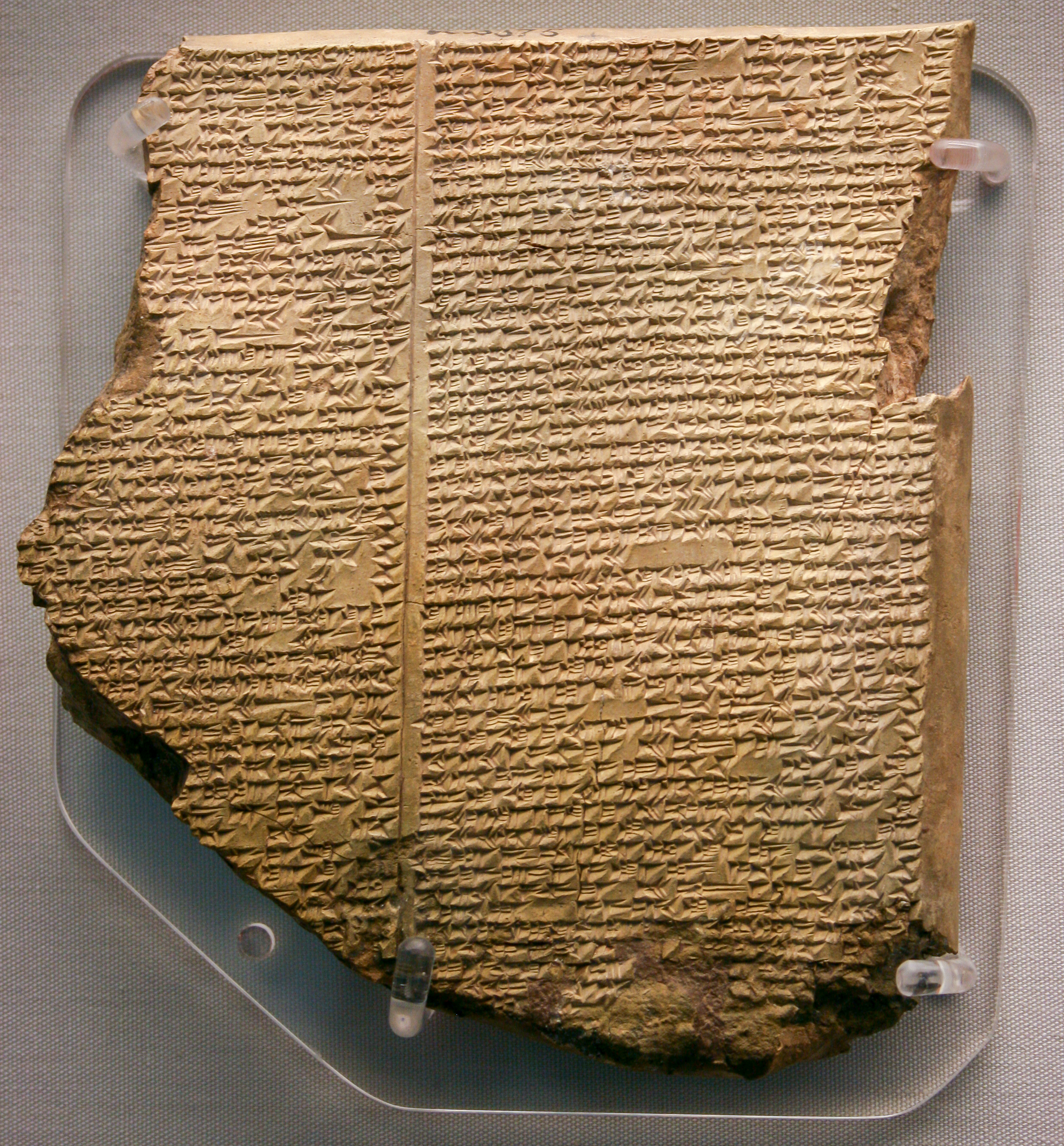
"The Flood Tablet", the eleventh tablet of the Gilgamesh Epic describes how the gods sent a flood to destroy the world. Like Noah, Utnapishtim was forewarned and built an ark to house and preserve living things. After the flood, he sent out birds to look for dry land (British Museum).

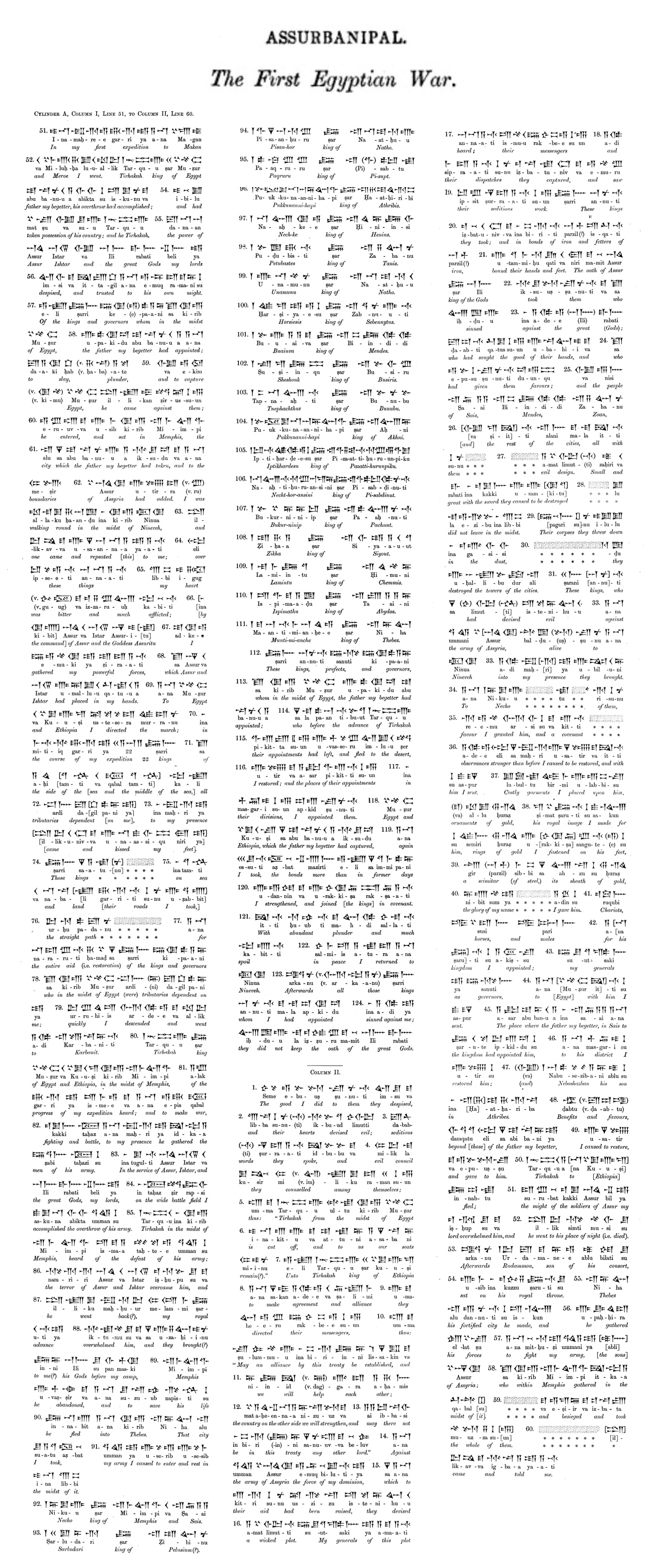
Translation of Ashurbanipal's "The First Egyptian War" from the Rassam cylinder.

In 1872, Smith achieved worldwide fame by his translation of the Chaldaean account of the Great Flood, which he read before the Society of Biblical Archaeology on 3 December. The audience included the sitting prime minister, William Ewart Gladstone. According to the accounts of his coworkers in the reading room, on the day of the discovery, when Smith realized what he was reading he "began to remove articles of his clothing" and run around the room shouting in delight.

This work is better known today as the eleventh tablet of the Epic of Gilgamesh, one of the oldest known works of literature, discovered by Hormuzd Rassam in 1853 on an archaeological mission for the British Museum on behalf of his colleague and mentor Austen Henry Layard. The following January, Edwin Arnold, the editor of The Daily Telegraph, arranged for Smith to go to Nineveh at the expense of that newspaper and carry out excavations with a view to finding the missing fragments of the Flood story. This journey resulted not only in the discovery of some missing tablets, but also of fragments that recorded the succession and duration of the Babylonian dynasties.

In November 1873 Smith again left England for Nineveh for a second expedition, this time at the expense of the museum, and continued his excavations at the tell of Kouyunjik (Nineveh). An account of his work is given in Assyrian Discoveries, published early in 1875. The rest of the year was spent in fixing together and translating the fragments relating to the creation, the results of which were published in The Chaldaean Account of Genesis (1880, co-written with Archibald Sayce).

== Final expedition and death ==
In March 1876, the trustees of the British Museum sent Smith once more to excavate the rest of the Library of Ashurbanipal. At İkizce, a small village about sixty miles northeast of Aleppo, he fell ill with dysentery. He died in Aleppo on 19 August. He left a wife and several children to whom an annuity of 150 pounds was granted by the Queen.

== In popular culture ==
The story of George Smith appears in fictionalised form in Elif Shafak's 2025 novel There Are Rivers in the Sky. In it George is reimagined as King Arthur of the Sewers and Slums.

== Bibliography ==
Smith wrote about eight important works, including linguistic studies, historical works, and translations of major Mesopotamian literary texts. They include:

- George Smith (1871). History of Assurbanipal, translated from the cuneiform inscriptions.
- George Smith (1875). Assyrian Discoveries: An Account of Explorations and Discoveries on the Site of Nineveh, During 1873 to 1874
- George Smith (1876). The Chaldean Account of Genesis
- George Smith (1878), Sayce, A.H (ed.), History of Sennacherib: Translated from the Cuneiform Inscriptions, London: Williams & Norgate
- George Smith (18–). The History of Babylonia. Edited by Archibald Henry Sayce.

Online editions

- History of Assurbanipal, translated from the cuneiform inscriptions. London: Williams and Norgate, 1871. From Google Books.
- Assyrian Discoveries. New York: Scribner, Armstrong & Co., 1876. From Google Books.
- The Chaldean Account of Genesis. New York: Scribner, Armstrong & Co., 1876. From WisdomLib.
- History of Sennacherib. London: Williams and Norgate, 1878. From Internet Archive.
- The History of Babylonia. London: Society for Promoting Christian Knowledge; New York: E. & J. B. Young. From Internet Archive.
