= Paul Schröder =

Paul Gustav Albert Schröder (born 1 February 1844 in Elsterwerda; died 13 October 1915 in Jena) was a German Semiticist, orientalist, diplomat, and consul general.

== Life ==
Born in the South Brandenburg town of Elsterwerda as the son of the local magistrate Johann Carl Schröder (1813–1849), Paul Schröder attended the Latin secondary school in Halle from 1855 to 1862. He then studied Oriental languages at the University of Halle and at the University of Berlin. During his studies, in 1863 he became a member of the Burschenschaft Frankonia Halle. In 1867 he earned his doctorate at Halle with the dissertation De linguae Phoeniciae proprietatibus.

From 1869 to 1882 and again from 1885 to 1888 he served as an embassy interpreter in Constantinople, and in between as German consul and later as Consul General of the German Empire for Syria in Beirut. Schröder traveled widely in the Orient and pursued geographical as well as archaeological studies, focusing particularly on ancient Semitic epigraphy. In 1871 he was elected a full member of the Greek Philological Society of Constantinople. In 1909 he retired and lived in Lichterfelde and later in Jena, where he died in 1915.

Schröder was regarded as an outstanding expert on Oriental languages. In 1869 he published his work Die phönizische Sprache ("The Phoenician Language"). He also spent time in Cyprus for study in 1870 and 1873.

== Selected works ==
- De linguae Phoeniciae proprietatibus particula prima. Dissertation, Halle, 1867.
- Die phönizische Sprache. Entwurf einer Grammatik, nebst Sprach- und Schriftproben. Halle: Verlag der Buchhandlung des Waisenhauses, 1869. (Reprint: Sändig Reprint, 1979, ISBN 3-253-03071-7.) Full text
