= Dali, Cyprus =

Dali: Δάλι (Greek); Dali (Turkish)
- Municipality
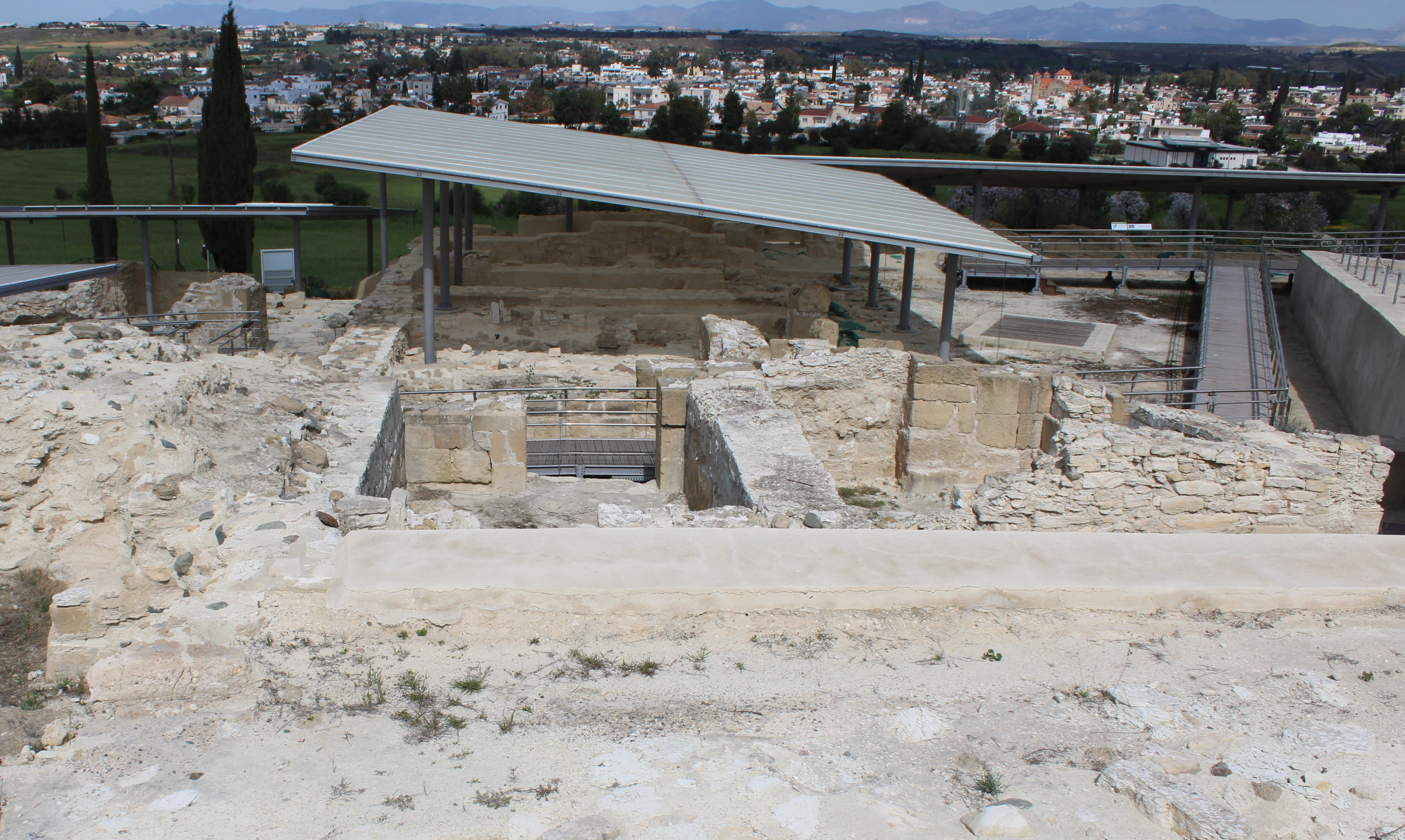
- View of the Idalion Palace ruins and part of the town in the background

- Location in Cyprus
- Coordinates: 35°1′16″N 33°25′12″E
- Country: Cyprus
- District: Nicosia District
- Established: 1100 AD

Population (2021)
  - Total: 12,350
- Time zone: UTC+2 (EET)
  - Summer (DST): UTC+3 (EEST)
- Website: dali.org.cy

Dali (or Dhali; Greek: Δάλι; Turkish: Dali) is a town in Cyprus, located in the South Nicosia area about 20 km (12 mi) south of central Nicosia and is at an altitude of 220 m (720 ft). It is the largest settlement amongst a group of villages in the area which are connected to Dali by a radial road network. The dominant element of this area around Dali is the Yialias River, on which the people were dependent in former times.

Dali is built close to the Yialias riverbed, on its southern side. Further north, the municipal area is dissected by the Alikos, a tributary of the Yialias, where the Dali industrial zone is sited. This consists of many light industrial units.

Dali originates from the ancient city of Idalion. In 2001, it had a population of 5,834. By 2011, the population had almost doubled to 10,466, and is now 12,350 (2021 census).

== Ancient Idalion ==
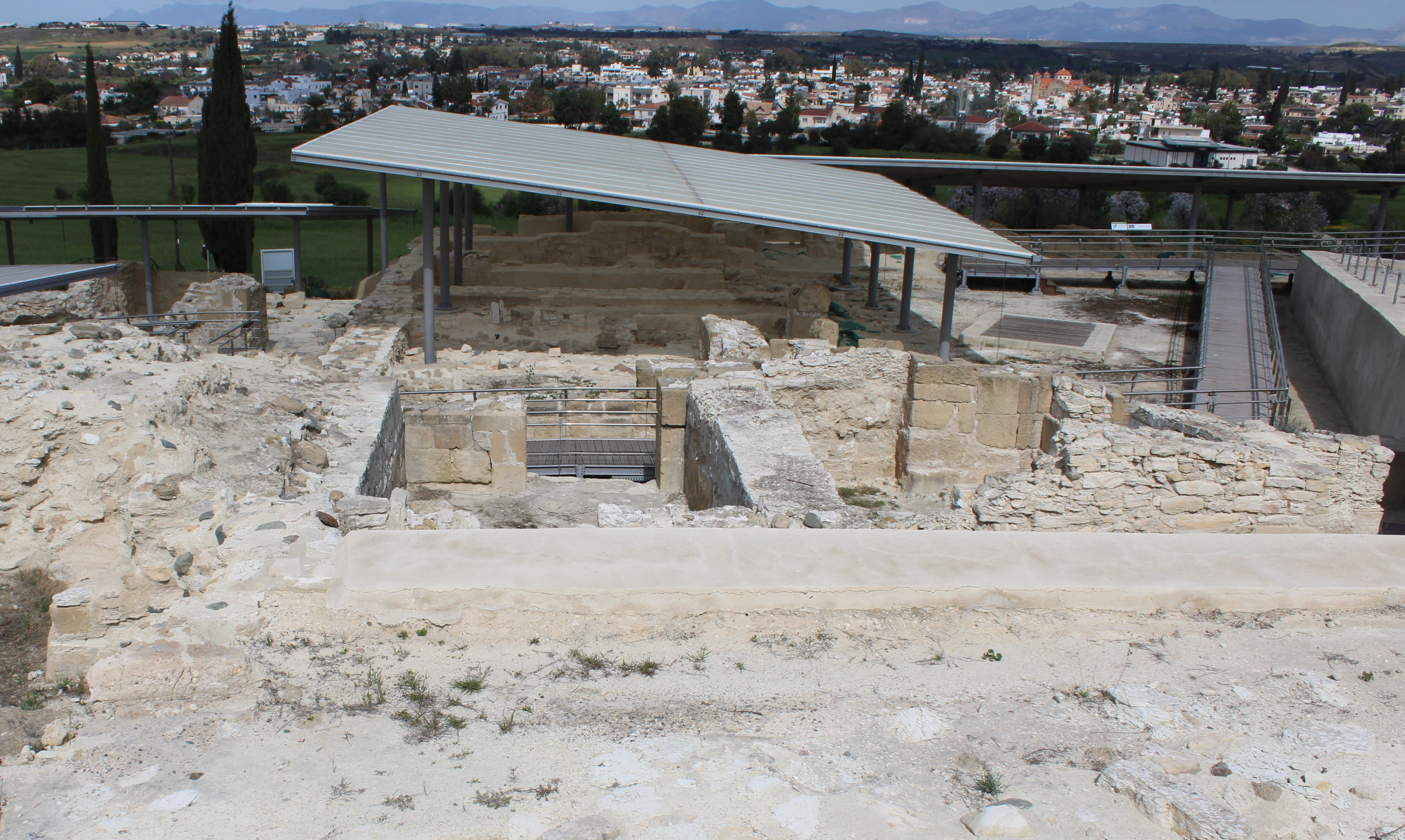
The ancient palace of Idalion, Dali and Kyrenia mountains in the background

Idalium or Idalion was an ancient city on place of modern Dali. The city was founded on the copper trade in the 3rd millennium BC. Recent excavations have uncovered major buildings on the site which are open to visitors. A new museum is also near to the site. The ancient city was located in the fertile Gialias valley and flourished there as an economic centre due to its location close to the mines in the eastern foothills of the Troodos Mountains and its proximity to the cities and ports on the south and east coast. Idalion prospered and became so wealthy that it was among the 11 cities of Cyprus listed on the Sargon Stele (707 BC) and first among the ten Cypriot kingdoms listed on the prism (many-sided tablet) of the Assyrian king Esarhaddon (680–669 BC). it was controlled by the Phoenicians of Kition in Persian period of Cyprus, and became a Phoenician influenced city for the following periods.

== Local Government Reform ==
Dali became a municipality in 1996, having previously been a community or village authority.

Following local government reform in 2024, Dali was merged into the new municipality of South Nicosia-Idalion.

The table below lists the previous local authorities that compose the new municipality, which now become municipal districts each with a deputy mayor.

District	New Municipality	Municipal District	Pop 2021	Pre	No.Cllrs(*)
Nicosia	SOUTH NICOSIA-DALI	TOTAL	22,632		20
Nicosia	South Nicosia-Dali	Alambra	1,655	C	2
Nicosia	South Nicosia-Dali	Dali	12,350	M	8
Nicosia	South Nicosia-Dali	Lympia	2,911	C	3
Nicosia	South Nicosia-Dali	Nisou	2,132	C	2
Nicosia	South Nicosia-Dali	Pera Chorio	3,002	C	3
Nicosia	South Nicosia-Dali	Potamia	582	C	2

Note: Column "Pre" indicates previous status: M (municipality), C (community)
