= Emilia Masson =

Émilia Masson
- Born: May 24, 1940; Belgrade
- Died: August 7, 2017 (aged 77); Paris
- Known for: work on Cypro-Minoan inscriptions
- Spouse: Olivier Masson
- Scientific career
- Fields: Linguistics, Epigraphy

Émilia Masson (née Émilia Jovanovic-Slavinski; May 24 1940 - August 7 2017) was a linguist and epigrapher whose areas of research included the undeciphered Cypro-Minoan writing system from ancient Cyprus, and the ancient Anatolian language Hittite.

== Biography ==
Émilia Masson was born in Belgrade on May 24 1940. She studied in Yugoslavia and in France, and her doctoral dissertation Recherches sur les plus anciens emprunts sémitiques en grec (Research on the most ancient Semitic loanwords in Greek) was published in Paris in 1967. She taught at the École normale supérieure and the École pratique des hautes études, and in 1972 joined the Centre National de la Recherche Scientifique (National Centre for Scientific Research) in Paris as a researcher; in 1983 was one of the founding members of the Centre d'Études Chypriotes (Centre for Cypriot Studies), which was founded by her husband. From 1969, she began working on the Cypro-Minoan texts, publishing monographs on the Cypro-Minoan inscribed clay balls from Enkomi and Hala Sultan Tekke in 1971 and on the Cypro-Minoan inscriptions found in Ugarit (Syria) in 1974, and frequently collaborating with the Cypriot archaeologist Vassos Karageorghis and with her husband Olivier Masson (1922-1997), who was also a linguist and epigrapher specialising in the study of Cyprus, to publish inscriptions discovered during excavations. She also published on the Hittite language, and from the 1980s she began to focus particularly on Anatolian studies and on Bronze Age religious practices, publishing books on religious sites in the Hittite city of Yazılıkaya in Turkey and on the Bronze Age rock-carvings of the Vallée des merveilles in the French Alps.

After Masson's death on August 7 2017 in Paris, her archives, along with her husband's, were donated by their daughter Diane to the Centre d'Études Chypriotes (Centre for Cypriot Studies); they are now divided between the University of Paris Nanterre, the Fédération Maison de l’Orient et de la Méditerranée, and the Louvre Museum's Department of Eastern Antiquities.

=== Personal life ===
The Massons had two daughters, Ariane (about whose death from cancer Masson wrote a memoir, Quand la vie s'en va [When life goes away]) and Diane.

== Selected publications ==
- Recherches sur les plus anciens emprunts sémitiques en grec (Études et commentaires 47), Paris, Klincksieck, 1967.
- Étude de vingt-six boules d’argile inscrites trouvées à Enkomi et à Hala Sultan Tekké (Chypre) (Studies in Mediterranean archaeology 31,1), Göteborg, 1971.
- Cyprominoica : répertoires, documents de Ras Shamra : essais d’interprétation (Studies in Mediterranean archaeology 31,2), Göteborg, 1974.
- Le panthéon de Yazılıkaya, nouvelles lectures (Recherche sur les grandes civilisations. Synthèse 3), Paris, ADPF, 1981.
- Les Douze Dieux de l'immortalité. Croyances indo-européennes à Yazzlzkaya, Préface d’André Caquot, Coll. Vérité des Mythes, Les Belles Lettres, Paris 1989.
