= Amathus bilingual =

5th-century Cypriot-Greek inscription

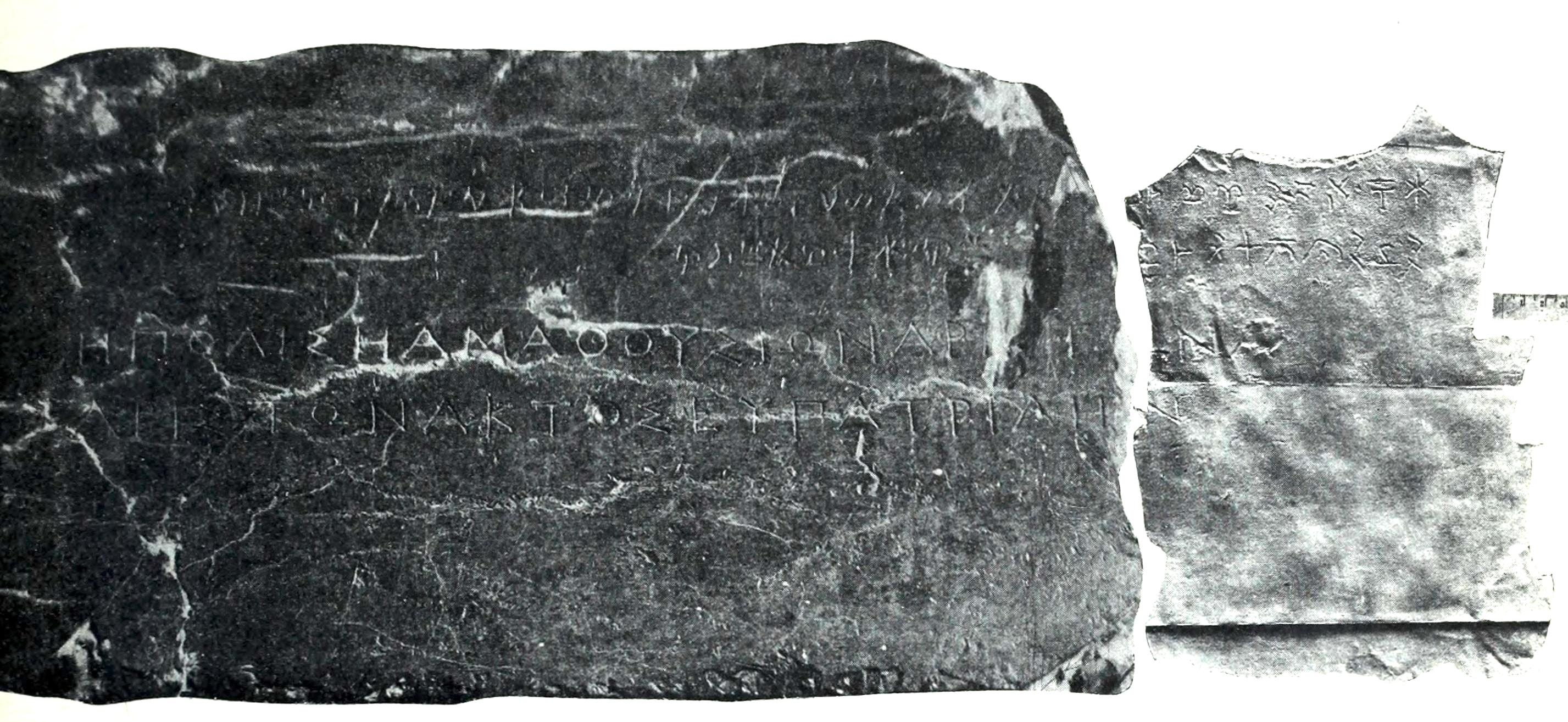
Amathus bilingual

Amathus bilingual sketch

The Amathus bilingual was an inscription on black marble from ancient Cyprus.

It features a bilingual dedication inscribed in both Eteocypriot and Greek. Discovered and published in 1914 by Ernst Sittig, the inscription has been important to the decipherment of Eteocypriot. The monument was lost during its transport to the United States.

The inscription is thought to date to shortly after the expulsion of Amathus's last king, Androkles, around 312–311 BCE.

== Discovery and Provenance ==
Ernst Sittig discovered the inscription in an antique shop in Limassol, in the region of ancient Amathus. The inscription is engraved on a slab of black marble, broken into two parts. After its publication with photographs in 1914, the artifact was lost — possibly during transport to America, as later suggested by Sittig in correspondence with Olivier Masson.

== Description ==
The Greek text is inscribed in two lines and reads:

Ἡ πόλις ἡ Ἀμαθουσίων
Ἀρίστωνα Ἀριστώνακτος εὐπατρίδην

Translation: "The city of the Amathusians (has dedicated) the (statue of) Ariston, son of Aristonax, of noble birth."

The Eteocypriot text is written above the Greek, in a different script, in retrograde direction and smaller lettering. Though longer, it broadly conveys the same message.

a na | ma to ri | u mi e | sa i mu ku la i la sa na | a ri si to no se | a ra to va na ka so ko o se ke ra ke re tu lo se ta ka | na o mu so ti | a lo | ka i li po ti

== Bibliography ==
- Sittig, Ernst. "Ἀμαθοῦντος δίγλωσσος ἐπιγραφή." Ἀρχαιολογικὴ Ἐφημερίς (1914): 1–2.
- Masson, Olivier. Les inscriptions chypriotes syllabiques. Paris, 1983.
- Woudhuizen, Fred C. "The Amathus Bilingual Inscription." In: De Hattuša à Memphis, Cahiers Kubaba, Paris, 2012, pp. 193–199.
