= Alexander Stuart Murray =

British archaeologist (1841–1904)

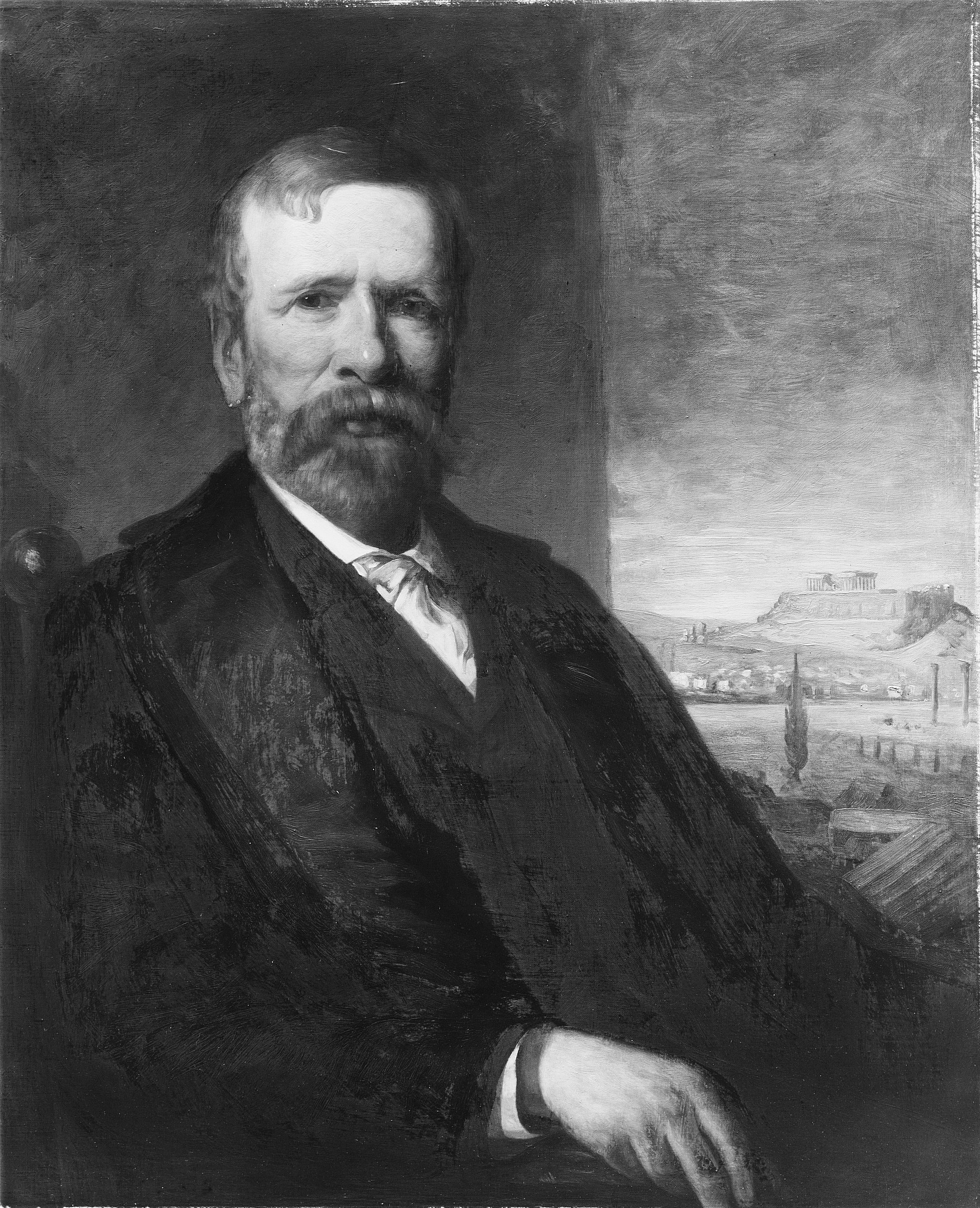
- Murray in 1890
- Born: 8 January 1841; Arbroath, Scotland
- Died: March 1904 (aged 63)
- Scientific career
- Fields: Archaeology

Alexander Stuart Murray, FBA (8 January 1841 – March 1904) was a British museum curator and archaeologist, whose worked at the British Museum throughout his career from 1867 until 1904, first under Charles Newton and then as Keeper of the Department of Greek and Roman Antiquities from 1886. He expanded the department's collection, wrote books on classical art and archaeology and organized excavations on Cyprus.

== Life ==
Murray was born at Arbroath, Scotland, and was educated there, at the Royal High School, Edinburgh, and at the Universities of Edinburgh and Berlin. In 1867 he entered the British Museum as an Assistant in the Department of Greek and Roman Antiquities under Sir Charles Thomas Newton (1816-1894), whom he succeeded as Keeper in 1886. His younger brother, George Robert Milne Murray (1858–1911), was made keeper of the botanical department in 1895, a rare instance of two brothers becoming heads of departments at the museum.

Murray's German studies were important for this future career, in terms of the language and his familiarity with modern methods of archaeology and textual criticism, but also in building his network of colleagues. In 1873 Murray published a Manual of Mythology, and in the following year contributed to the Contemporary Review two articles—one on the Homeric question—which led to a friendship with Mr Gladstone, the other on ancient Greek vase painters. In 1874 he also published the popular work Who's Who in Mythology. In 1877, he contributed a chapter on Cypriot pottery to Luigi Palma di Cesnola's Ancient Cyprus. Its Cities, Temples and Tombs (London: John Murray, first edition). In 1880-1883 he brought out his History of Greek Sculpture: From the Earliest Times Down to the Age of Pheidias (London: John Murray), which at once became a standard work. In 1886, he was selected by the Society of Antiquaries of Scotland to deliver the next year's Rhind lectures on archaeology, out of which grew his Handbook of Greek Archaeology (London: John Murray, 1892).

Murray was not a field archaeologist, but along with Newton supported the establishment of the Cyprus Exploration Fund in 1887, many of the finds from whose excavations (mainly at Palaepaphos, Marion-Arsinoe and Salamis) were donated to the British Museum. Between 1893 and 1896 he oversaw a series of excavations in Cyprus undertaken by means of a bequest of £2000 from Miss Emma Tournour Turner which allowed the British Museum to conduct large-scale excavations on Cyprus for the first time. The Turner Bequest excavations focused on Amathus (near modern Limassol), Kourion (near Episkopi) and at Enkomi-Ayios Iakovos, the last of which Murray participated in himself at the beginning of the season in 1896. A selection of the objects obtained by the British Museum are described and illustrated in Excavations in Cyprus, written by Murray, and Assistants Henry Beauchamp Walters and Arthur Hamilton Smith, published by the Trustees of the Museum in 1900 (reissued in 1969). Murray also organized several additional expeditions to Cyprus between 1897 and 1899, around Maroni, Hala Sultan Tekke, Kouklia and Klavdhia, again supervised on the ground by his assistants Walters and Smith and by students seconded from the British School at Athens, such as John Crowfoot and Francis Bertram Welch. These later excavations were not published in detail at the time, but many of the finds were included in catalogues of the British Museum's collections which were began to appear under Murray's direction from 1892 onwards, mainly written by his Assistants. Nonetheless, the Cyprus excavations contributed significantly to contemporary knowledge of the Cypriot and eastern Mediterranean Bronze Age, as did other important acquisitions of Aegean Bronze Age material by Murray, most notably the Aigina Treasure (in 1892).

In addition to the numerous works he edited or oversaw, Murray's other official publications include three folio volumes entitled, Terracotta Sarcophagi, Greek and Etruscan, in the British Museum (1898), White Athenian Vases in the British Museum (1896, with A.H. Smith) and Designs from Greek Vases in the British Museum (1894, also with Smith). In 1898 he wrote for the Portfolio a monograph on Greek bronzes, founded on lectures delivered at the Royal Academy in that year, and he contributed many articles on archaeology to standard publications.

In recognition of his services to archaeology he was made LL.D. of Glasgow University in 1887 and elected a corresponding member of the Berlin Academy of Sciences in 1900.

== Works ==
- Manual of Mythology (1873)
- Who's Who in Mythology: A Classic Guide to the Ancient World (1874)
- Two Vases from Cyprus (1887)
- Excavations in Cyprus: bequest of Miss E. T. Turner to the British Museum (1900)
