= Olivier Masson =

French university teacher (1922-1997)

- Born: 3 April 1922; Paris, France
- Died: 23 February 1997 (aged 74); Paris, France
- Occupation: Linguist
- Spouse: Emilia Jovanovic

Olivier Masson (3 April 1922, Paris – 23 February 1997, Paris) was a French linguist interested in Greek, Cypriot and Phoenician epigraphy, especially with the Cypriot syllabary and Cypriot archaeology in general. He was professor of Greek philology at the École pratique des hautes études.

He specialized in Greek inscriptions from Cyprus as well as in the study of the Cypro-Minoan script, compiling a corpus of inscriptions of the latter (now obsolete, but the more recent corpus of S. Ferrara is only partially realised).

His wife was Emilia Masson (1940–2017), née Jovanovic, originally from Serbia. A Hittologist by education, she also made a significant contribution to the archaeology of the Balkans and Asia Minor of the Neolithic and Bronze Ages, as well as in the studies of inscriptions from Cyprus and the Vinca culture. After her death, Olivier and Emilia's daughter Diana Masson donated her parents' library to the Center for Cypriot Studies.

== Publications ==
- Masson, O. (1957). Les inscriptions étéochypriotes: II. IV. Syria, 34 (1/2), 61-80.
- Masson, O. (1957). Cylindres et cachets chypriotes portant des caractères chyprominoens. Bulletin de Correspondance Hellénique, 81(1), 6-37.
- Masson, O. (1981). À propos des inscriptions chypriotes de Kafizin. Bulletin de correspondance hellénique, 105(2), 623-649.
- Masson, O. (1984). Cesnola et le Tresor de Curium (i). Cahiers du Centre d’Etudes Chypriotes, 1(1), 16-26.
- Masson, O., & Hermary, A. (1988). Le voyage de Ludwig Ross à Chypre en 1845 et les antiquités chypriotes du Musée de Berlin. Cahiers du Centre d’Études Chypriotes, 9(1), 3-10.
- Masson, O. (1990). Paul Perdrizet à Chypre en 1896. Cahiers du Centre d’Études Chypriotes, 13(1), 27-42.
- Masson, O. (1992). Encore les royaumes chypriotes dans la liste d'Esarhaddon. Cahiers du Centre d’Études Chypriotes, 18(2), 27-30.
- Masson, O. (1992). Diplomates et amateurs d'antiquités à Chypre vers 1866-1878. Journal des savants, 1(1), 123-154.
- Masson, O. (1996). La dispersion des antiquités chypriotes: les deux collections Cesnola. Cahiers du Centre d’Études Chypriotes, 25(1), 3-28.
- Masson, O. (1997). Bibliographie thématique des travaux d'Olivier Masson concernant Chypre. Cahiers du Centre d’Études Chypriotes, 27, 3-13.
