= Enkomi (archaeological site) =

Archaeological site in Cyprus

- Map of Cyprus
- 35°9′35″N 33°53′18″E
- Location: Island of Cyprus

Site notes
- Excavation dates: 1895–1898, 1930, 1934, 1958–1973
- Archaeologists: Alessandro Palma di Cesnola, A. S. Murray, Einar Gjerstad, Claude F. A. Schaeffer, Porphyrios Dikaios, Oliver Pelon
- Public access: Yes

Enkomi (also Mallia) is a 2nd millennium BC archaeological site on the eastern coast of Cyprus a short distance from the village of Enkomi. The site appears to currently be under disputed governance. A number of Cypro-Minoan Script inscriptions were found there including the longest known clay tablet. It has been suggested that this city was the Alashiya of the Amarna letters and in texts from several areas of the ancient Near East. The site is known for the hundreds of rich tombs that have been excavated and for exceptional metallurgic finds like the Ingot God and the Horned God.

== History ==
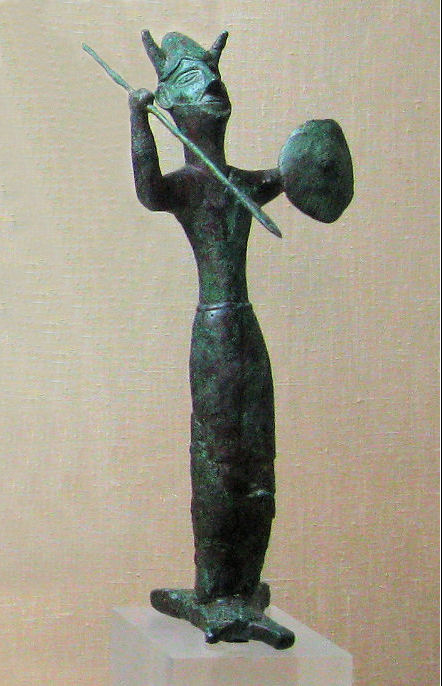
The bronze "Ingot God" from Enkomi, 12th century BC, Cyprus Archaeological Museum, Nicosia

The chronology of Cyprus during the later half of the 2nd millennium BC is defined as follows:

- Late Cypriot I LC I 1650–1550 BC
- Late Cypriot IIA LC IIA 1550–1450 BC
- Late Cypriot IIB LC IIB 1450–1300 BC
- Late Cypriot IIC LC IIC 1300–1200 BC
- Late Cypriot IIIA LC IIIA 1200–1100 BC
- Late Cypriot IIIB LC IIIB 1100–1050 BC

Enkomi was settled in the Middle Bronze Age, near an inlet from the sea (now silted up). From about the 16th to 12th centuries BC, it was an important trading center for copper, which was smelted at the site, with strong cultural links to Ugarit on the facing coast of Syria.

The complicated and badly disturbed stratigraphy of the site has four major phases, with many subdivisions:

- Level A, Middle Bronze, a poorly represented preliminary stratum on bedrock. Pottery and scarabs found there led the excavators to date the level to 1900 to 1700 BC. The site then had a period of abandonment leaving a sterile stratum in the archaeological record;
- Level I A, and B, at the beginning of the Late Bronze Age. Dated by the excavators to have started slowly c. 1550 BC, reached property by c. 1500 BC, and been destroyed by an earthquake c. 1400 BC. Corresponds to the Late Cypriote I and II;
- Level II A, and B, with many subdivisions, covering the elaborate expansion of the 14th and 13th centuries and ending in a mass destruction c. 1220 BC;
- Level III A, B, and C, with Mycenaean settlers, with a destructive attack, possibly related to the Sea Peoples in IIIA, culturally continuous with IIIB, ending in a destruction c. 1125 BC, and IIIC, a final, Mycenaean phase with dwindling population.

== Archaeology ==
=== Overview of Excavation History ===
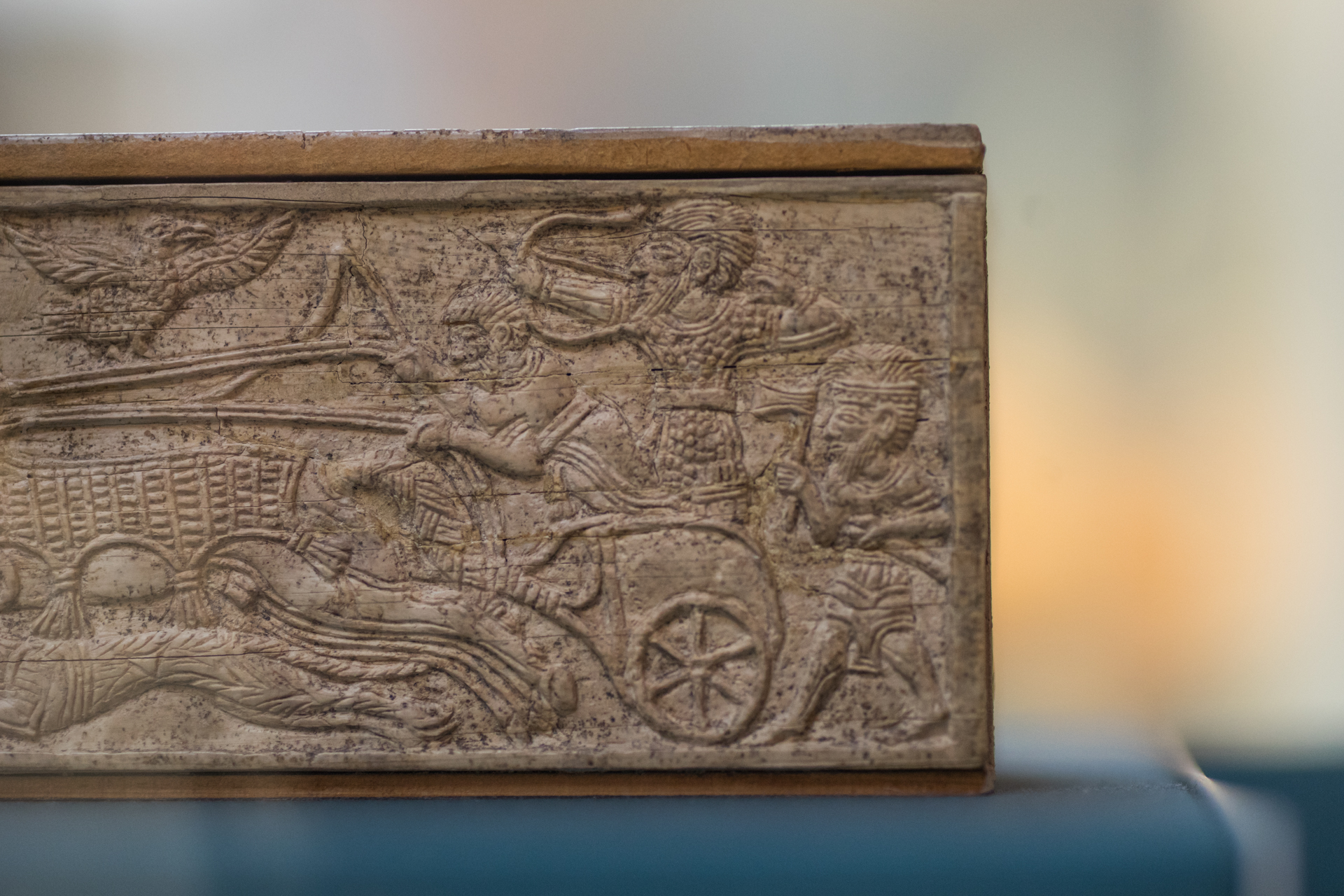
Detail of ivory game board found at Enkomi, Late Bronze Age, made on Cyprus or in Syria (British Museum)

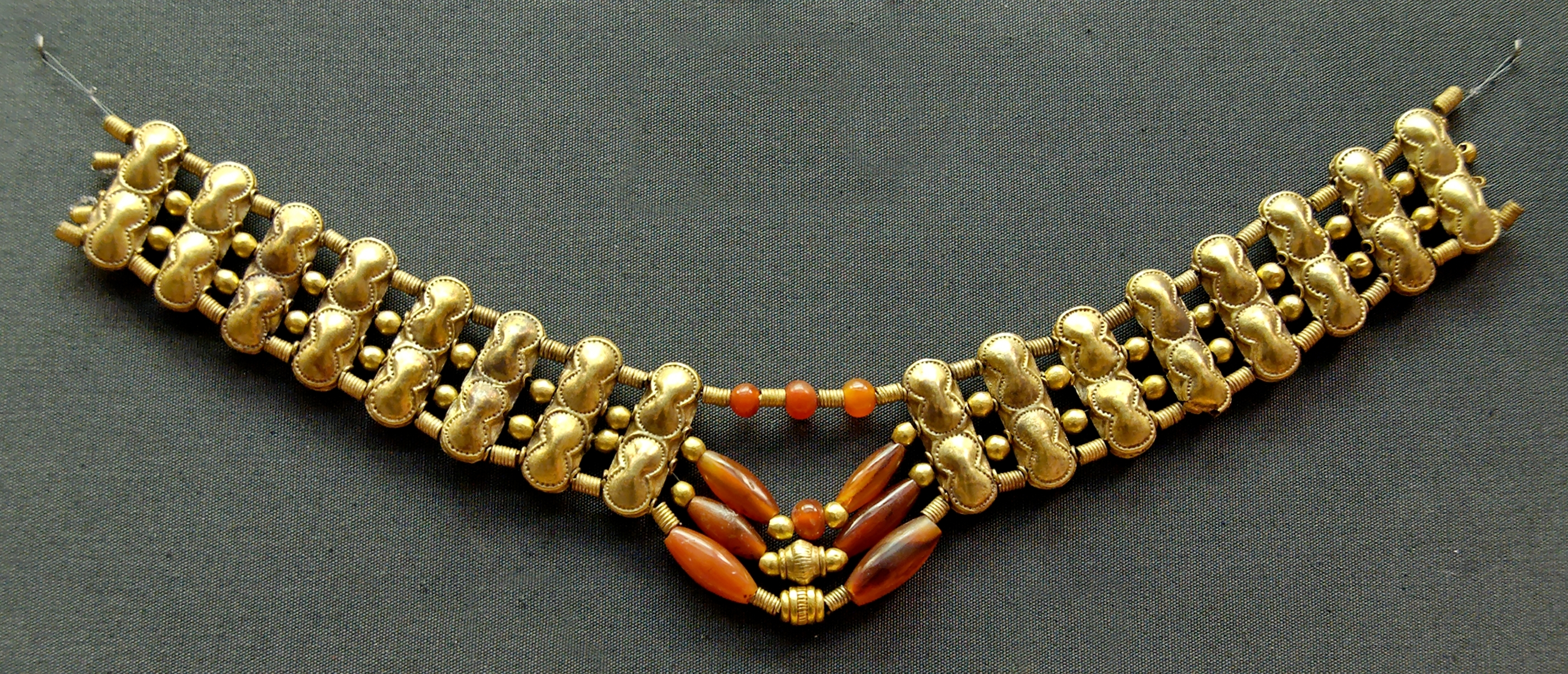
Necklace with gold beads and carnelian beads, Cypriot artwork with Mycenaean inspiration, c. 1400–1200 BCE. From Enkomi. British Museum

Following more than a decade of damage by looters attracted by the high quality of Enkomi's tomb gifts, Alessandro Palma di Cesnola drew the attention of archaeologists to the site after very briefly digging there in 1878. Most of the early excavations focused on the tomb area. The settlement remains were thought to be from the Byzantine period and a substantial portion were destroyed assuming they were unimportant. Alexander Stuart Murray worked there for the British Museum from 1895 to 1898. A total of 100 tombs were excavated. Under laws at the time, 2/3 of the finds went to the British Museum and the rest to the Cyprus Museum. The publication of excavation results was quite thin, mainly covering high status items. In 2003, the original excavation field notebook was published, detailing most of the individual tomb excavations. Unsuccessful trial excavations, also in the tomb area, were conducted in 1913 by the Cyprus Museum and in 1927 by R. Gunnis, though the latter did discover a hoard of bronzes. In 1930, a Swedish Cyprus Expedition team led by Einar Gjerstad excavated for two months in the tomb area, uncovering 22 "productive" tombs. Human remains were found seated and supine with robes fastened by gold pins, with grave goods of gold, silver, faience, and ivory. Some had diadems on their foreheads decorated with geometric ornaments, floral motifs or figures, and gold tin over their mouths. Ceramic and bronze vessels contained food and drink offerings. It has been suggested that one pottery shard was manufactured in Canaan, specifically in Ashdod. As they assumed that burial and settlement areas were separated the excavators used a pit digging technique that ended up destroying settlement remains:

"I made the worst kind of mistake a scholar can make: I was working on a pre-conceived idea. Since burial-grounds and settlements were topographically separated, as far as was known, during the whole Bronze Age in Cyprus, there was no reason to suppose that there were other habits in Enkomi"

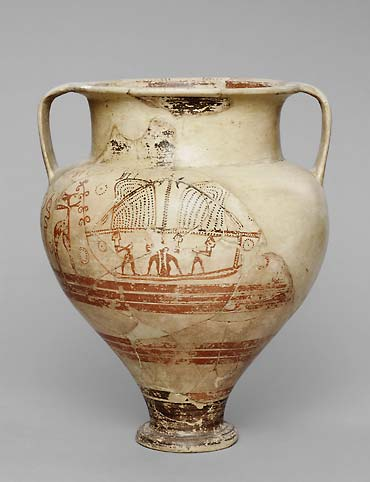
Mycenaean amphoroid krater found at Enkomi. The Swedish Cyprus Expedition.

In 1934, Claude Frédéric-Armand Schaeffer put in trial trenches, including about 200 soundings and partially excavating one building he named the Maison des Bronzes. Excavations were conducted between 1948 and 1973 by a joint expedition between Schaeffer for the French Expedition and Porphyrios Dikaios on behalf of the Cyprus Department of Antiquities. Early work determined that the site had been protected by a Cyclopean wall constructed of stone orthostat slabs up to 3.5 metres (11 ft) long. The wall enclosed an area of about 2.5 hectares. Cypriot excavations were conducted from 1848 until 1958 under Dikaios. French excavations, on behalf of the French National Centre for Scientific Research, proceeded under Schaeffer until 1970 at which point the expedition was led by Oliver Pelon. Excavation ended with the 1974 Turkish invasion of Cyprus and the status of excavated objects in Mission storage are currently unknown.

=== City Plan ===
Enkomi is enclosed by walls, with at least three gates at the north, west and south side located. Built on plain grounds, the city is supposed to have perpendicular streets: one Main Street from north to south and smaller ones from east to west, among which houses, sanctuaries and building complexes are located. Dikaios and Schaeffer's excavation focused on designated Area I and Area III (they are the only two areas which have been thoroughly excavated to the level of bedrock), which they treated as independent and not stratigraphically linked building entities. Besides, Dikaios tends to attribute the end of each occupation level to external invasion or massive destruction, such as the sea peoples invasion at the end of Bronze Age.

==== Area I ====
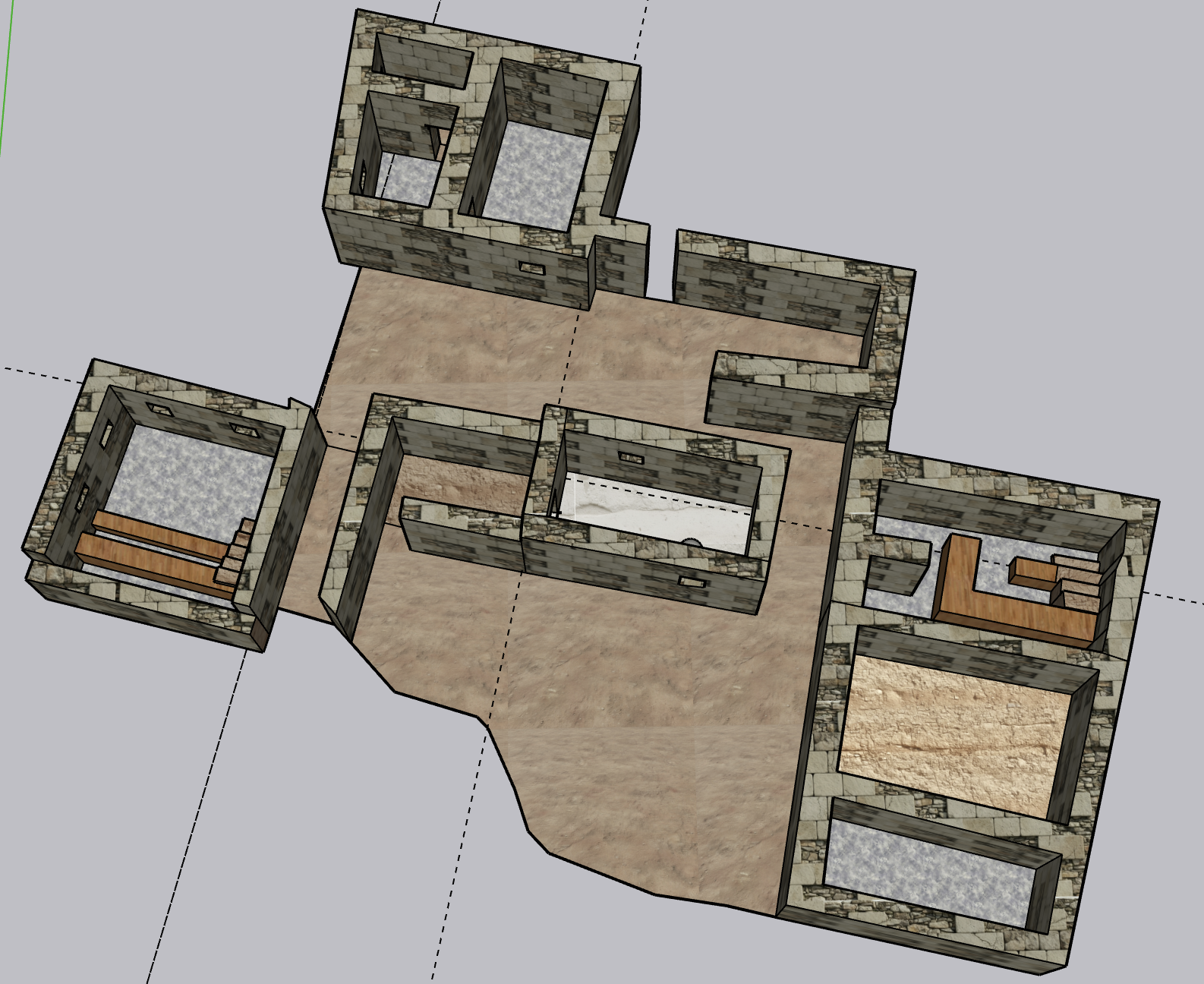
Reconstruction of a part of Area I in early stage, according to Dikaio's excavation

This area has no rich tombs. It has 12 rooms and 2 courts in its earliest stage, functioning as "an independent unit". In one particular room, infant burials from 2 different occupation periods are attested - the only room where intramural tombs are detected in this area. Infants are put into jars and then buried in a pit.

Most rooms in Area I could be interpreted as domestic structure, including vestibules, halls, and possibly rooms for storage, and even a corridor used as bathroom according to Dikaios.

==== Area III ====
Some archaeologists suppose Area III functions as "industrial facility, elite structure or fortification", especially in copper production. In contrast to Area I, Area III is oftener reused and rebuilt.

=== Metallurgy ===
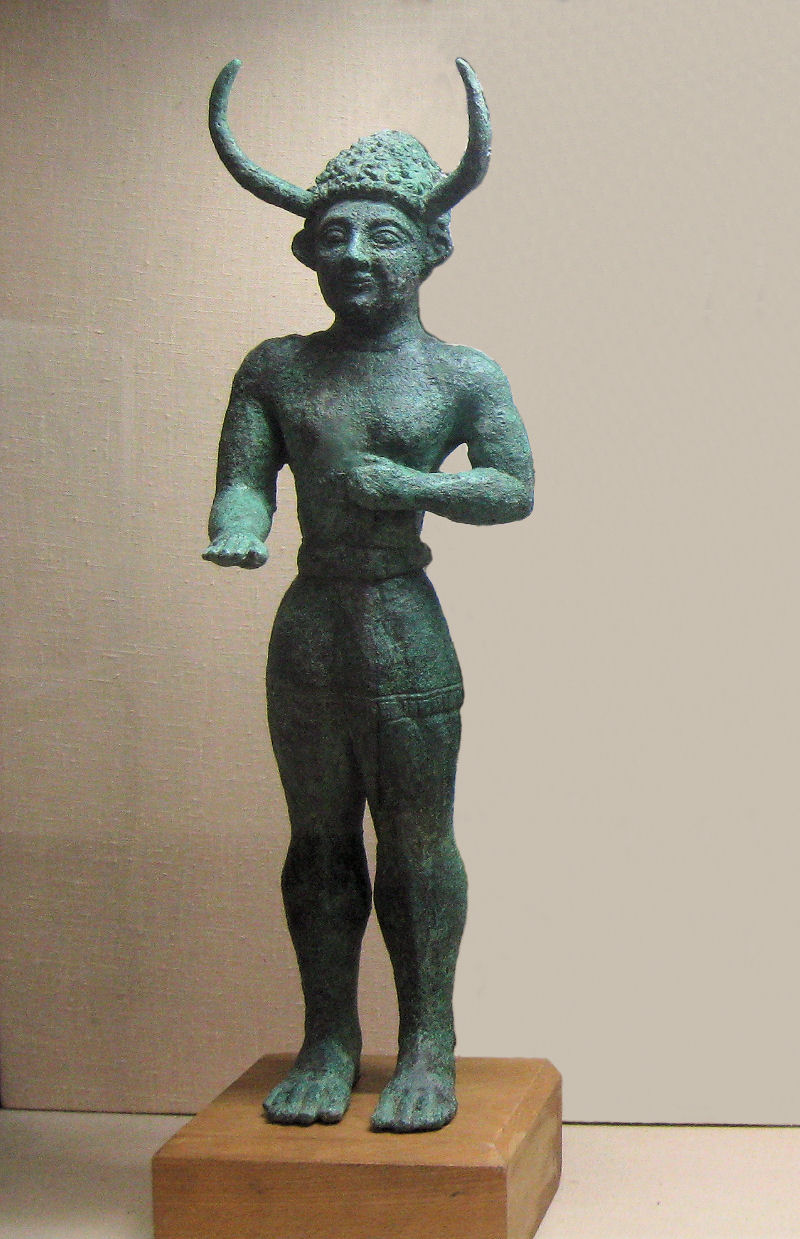
The bronze "Horned God" from Enkomi

An extensive metallurgy industry was found at Enkomi. Numerous production facilities, raw materials, and finished products were excavated, including three copper oxhide ingots (one at the Cyprus Museum and one at Harvey Mudd College). The most notable finished good finds were the "Ingot God", a statue wearing a horned conical hat and greaves, armed with shield and spear, and standing on a miniature hide-shaped ingot, and "Horned God".

The Horned God, measuring 0.55 metres (1.8 ft) in height, was found in a pit dug in the third phase of a very large tripartite ashlar building, built in the Late Cypriot III period (early 12th century BC) over earlier structures destroyed by an earthquake, also the dating of the statue. Large numbers of oxen skulls, stag antlers, animal bones, and miniature horns of gold sheet and other gold ornaments were found in the area in which the statue had originally stood, suggesting ritual activity. This level was also destroyed.

A decorated metal cup, the "Enkomi Cup" has been controversially claimed to use niello decoration, which would make it one of the earliest uses of this technique. However, controversy has continued since the 1960s as to whether the material used actually is niello.

=== The Sanctuary of the Ingot God ===
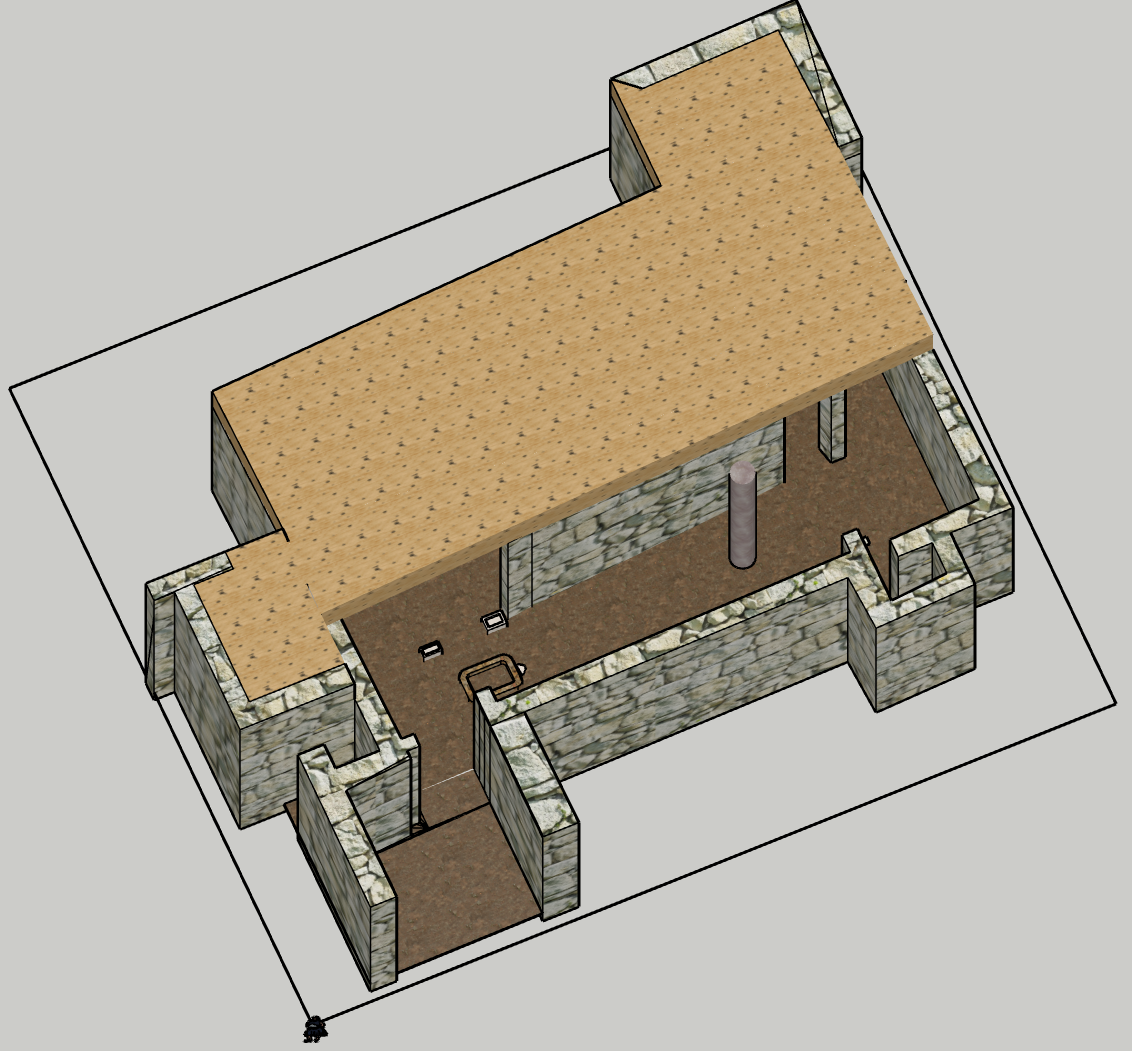
3D reconstruction of the Sanctuary of the Ingot God at Enkomi.

==== Description ====
The Sanctuary of the Ingot God was constructed around a beaten-earth floor with a burnt surface believed to be associated with the deposition of the bronze "Ingot God" figurine. The main hall included rubble walls and massive masonry pillars positioned perpendicular to the central axis of the structure.

Rubble benches coated with white lime lined the northern, southern, and western walls. Two niches were constructed on the northern side–one centrally placed and another to its west–made of mudbrick or pisé and covered with plaster.

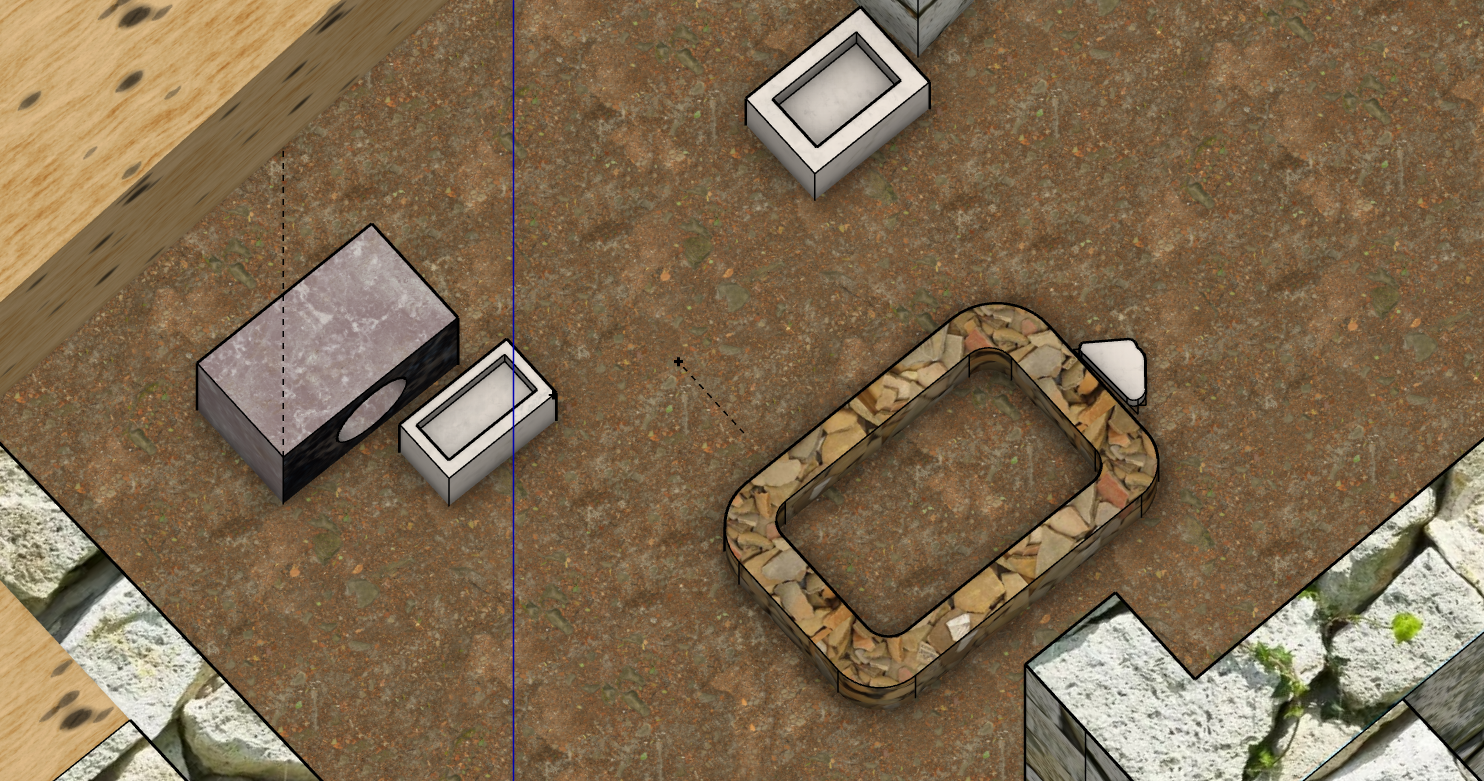
Hearth and foyer area inside the sanctuary.

A small room measuring 2 by 1.9 metres (6.6 by 6.2 ft) was added in the northeastern corner of the hall during a later architectural phase.

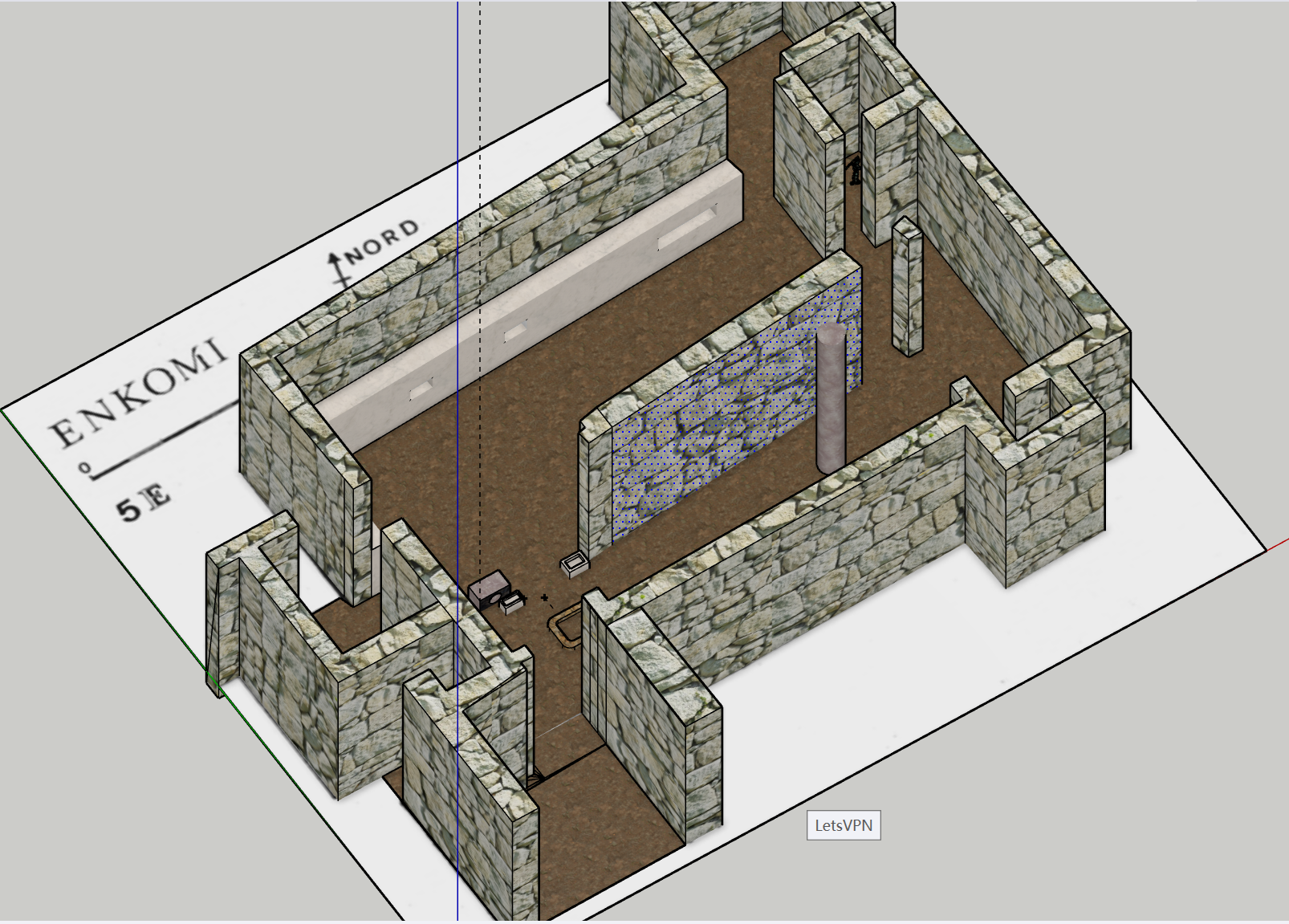
Structure of the sanctuary without rooftop.

==== Finds ====
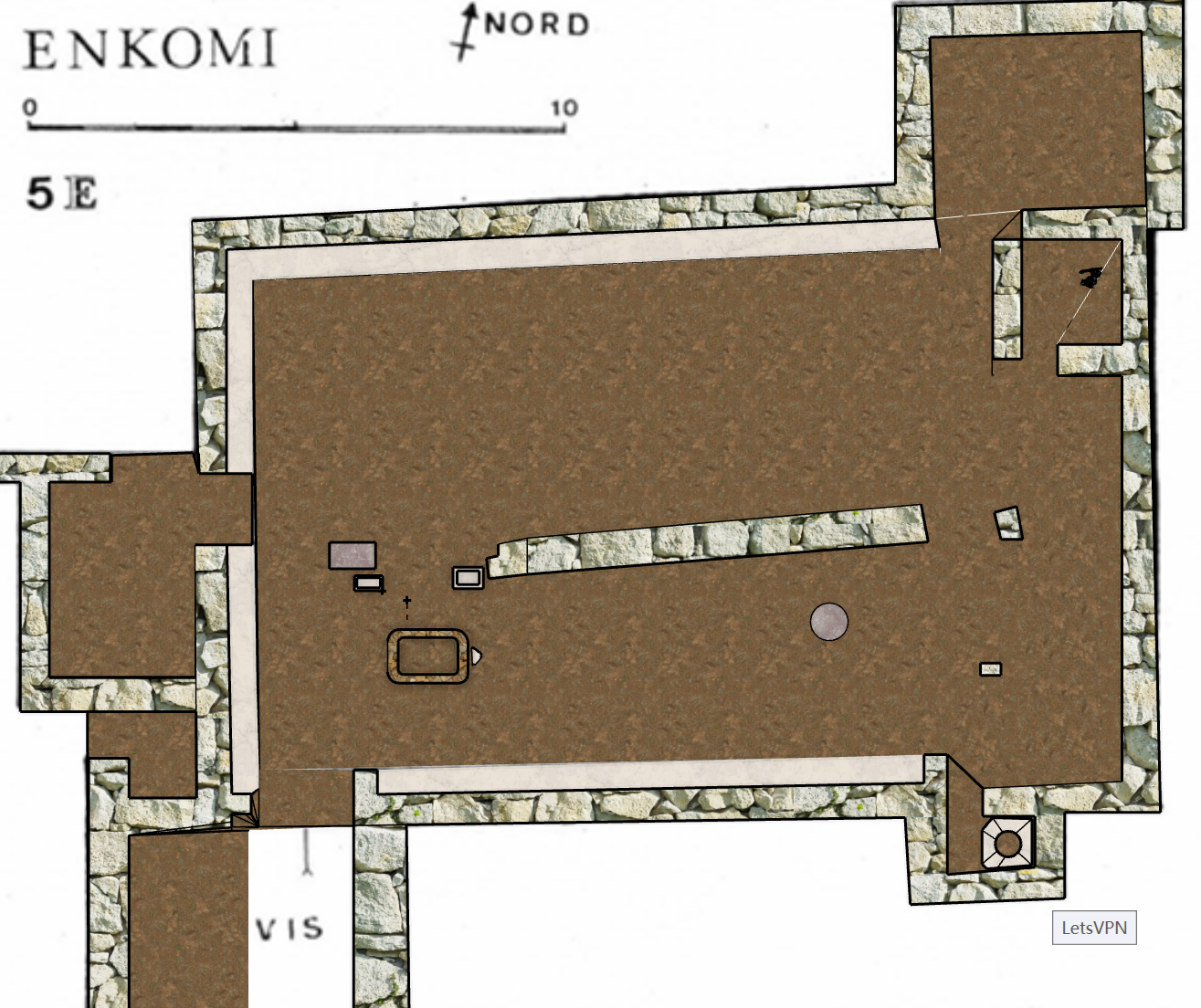
Bird's-eye view reconstruction of the sanctuary.

A bronze figurine approximately 0.35 metres (1.1 ft) metres high, wearing a linen cuirass, a horned helmet, and greaves, was discovered near the entrance. The figure holds an oval shield in one hand and a spear in the other, standing on a base interpreted as a copper ingot.

The central area of the hall contained a circular hearth coated in white plaster. Two ritual stone installations were found nearby; a concave stone block traditionally interpreted as a slaughtering table (autel supérieur) and a pierced block often associated with tethering sacrificial animals. However, recent scholarship notes that there is no direct residue or blood evidence confirming sacrificial activity.

Material finds from the sanctuary include deep bowls, an annular rhyton with bucranium spout, a bucchero juglet, a Canaanite jar, a ladle, six inscribed clay balls, a terracotta cylinder seal, lamps, rings, bronze and iron objects, and large quantities of ox skulls, horns, and small animal bones. A niche in the sanctuary contained a bronze knife and incised ox scapulae.

=== Burials ===
There are thought to have been around 2,000 tombs at the site. Most of the archaeological work at Enkomi has been on the intra-settlement tombs. The 1896 British team excavated about 100 tombs, mostly already looted. The Swedish work in 1930 excavated 28 tombs. In the most recent excavations, the French team dug 37 tombs and the Cypriot team excavated 30. Of the excavated tombs, most were chamber tombs. One was a tholos tomb (Tomb 71) and four were built tombs (Tombs 1, 11, 12 and 66). Several intramural infant and adult burials are also observed in Enkomi, as are pit graves and pot burials, which is also seen in other Eastern Mediterranean societies. In one case detected in Area I, an infant was buried in a Canaanite jar.

For extramural practices, the dead were "most commonly interred in rock cut chamber tombs". Differentiation in tombs is detected, reflecting social hierarchy and how ritual became social competition, owing to differentiation in the distribution of metal, especially imported, goods.

== Cypro-Minoan script finds ==
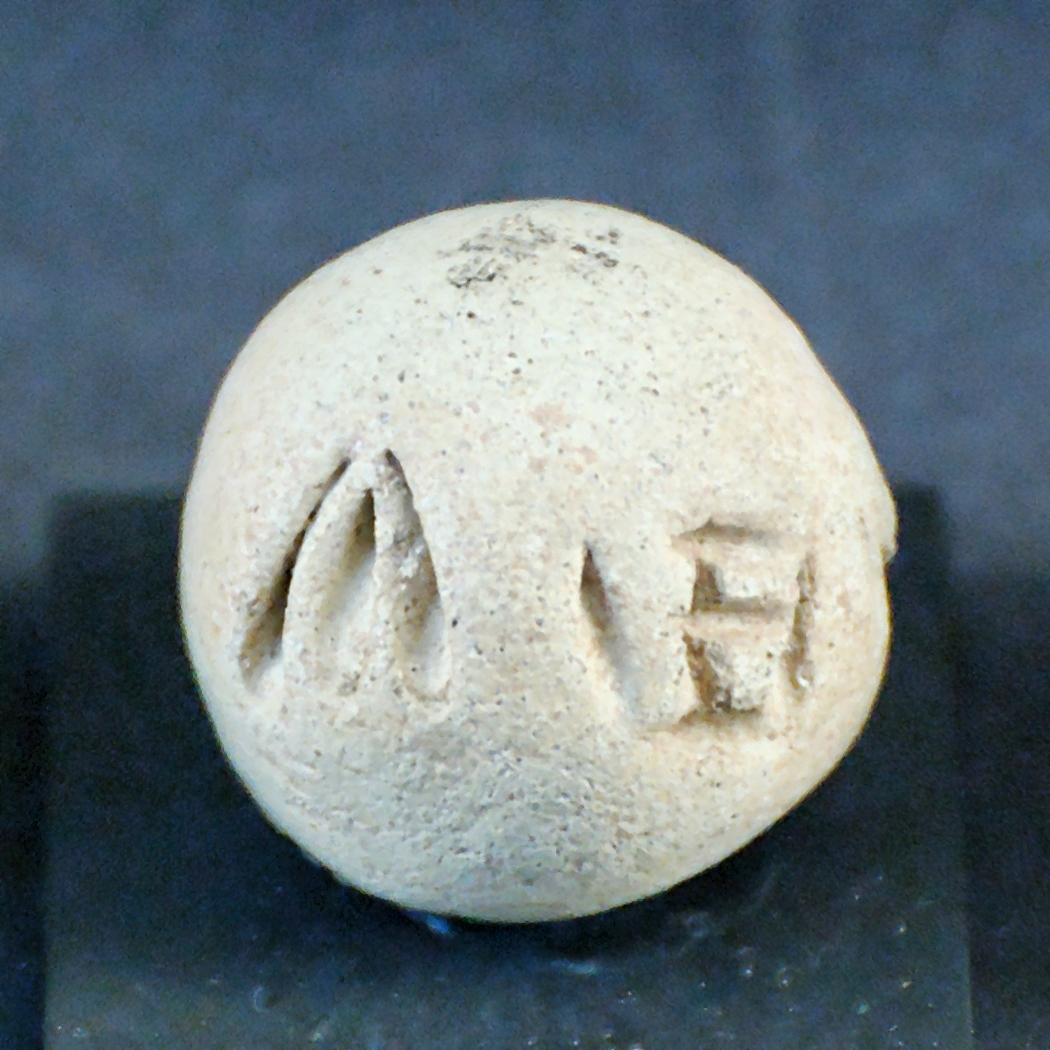
Clay ball cypro-minoan Louvre AM2226

In 1967 a small terracotta cylinder (#097 ENKO Arou 001) was found at Enkomi. It is dated to the Late Cypriot IIA–B period (fourteenth century BC) and is inscribed in the Cypro-Minoan 1 (CM1) variant, sometimes called Linear C. The text is the longest CM1 text found outside Syria. The cylinder holds 27 lines of text with 217 signs in total. The Cypro-Minoan Script is yet untranslated nor is the underlying language known with certainty.

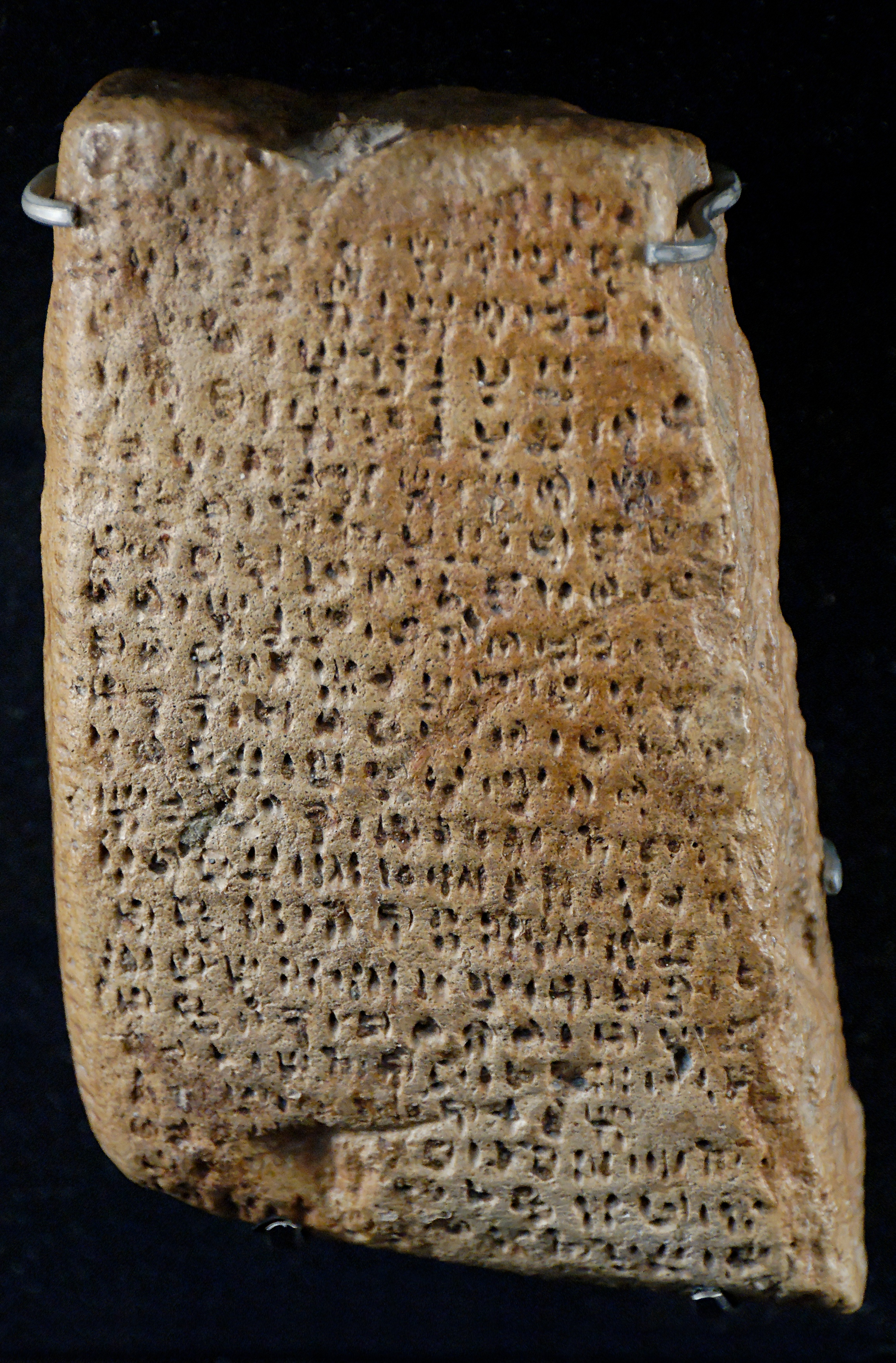
Cypro-Minoan tablet from Enkomi in the Louvre

Four Cypro-Minoan Script tablets have also been found, three are in the Cyprus Museum in Nicosia and one is in the Louvre Museum. One tablet (#1885) was found in the north area of the site in "room 103 of the Late Cypriote I building called the Fortress", with only the top portion remaining. It is written in the Cypro-Minoan variant and dates to LC IB (1525–1425 BC) and contains 23 total signs, 21 on the obverse and 2 on the edge. Two other tables were found in a Late Cypriote III context, one (#1193 in two fragments) dated to LC IIIB (12th century BC) in the north area and one (#1687) dated to LC IIIA (late 13th-early 12th century BC) in the central area. One, AM 2336, is of unknown context.

Short Cypro-Minoan inscriptions were found on three terracotta vessel. fragments. The first (Inv. 1904, PI. VI a) has four signs and part of a fifth and is dated to Mycenaean III C:lb (c. 1200 BC). The second (Inv. 4025, PI. VI b) contains six signs in two lines and is also dated to Mycenaean III C:lb (c. 1200 BC). The third (Inv 1848/12 PI. Vic) contains a single character incised after baking and its dating is unclear. Another example, found in a looted tomb during the 1913 trial excavation has 7 signs and is also of uncertain date. A single clay ball (AS 2226), held in the Louvre Museum, bears two signs.

== Fortified structure ==
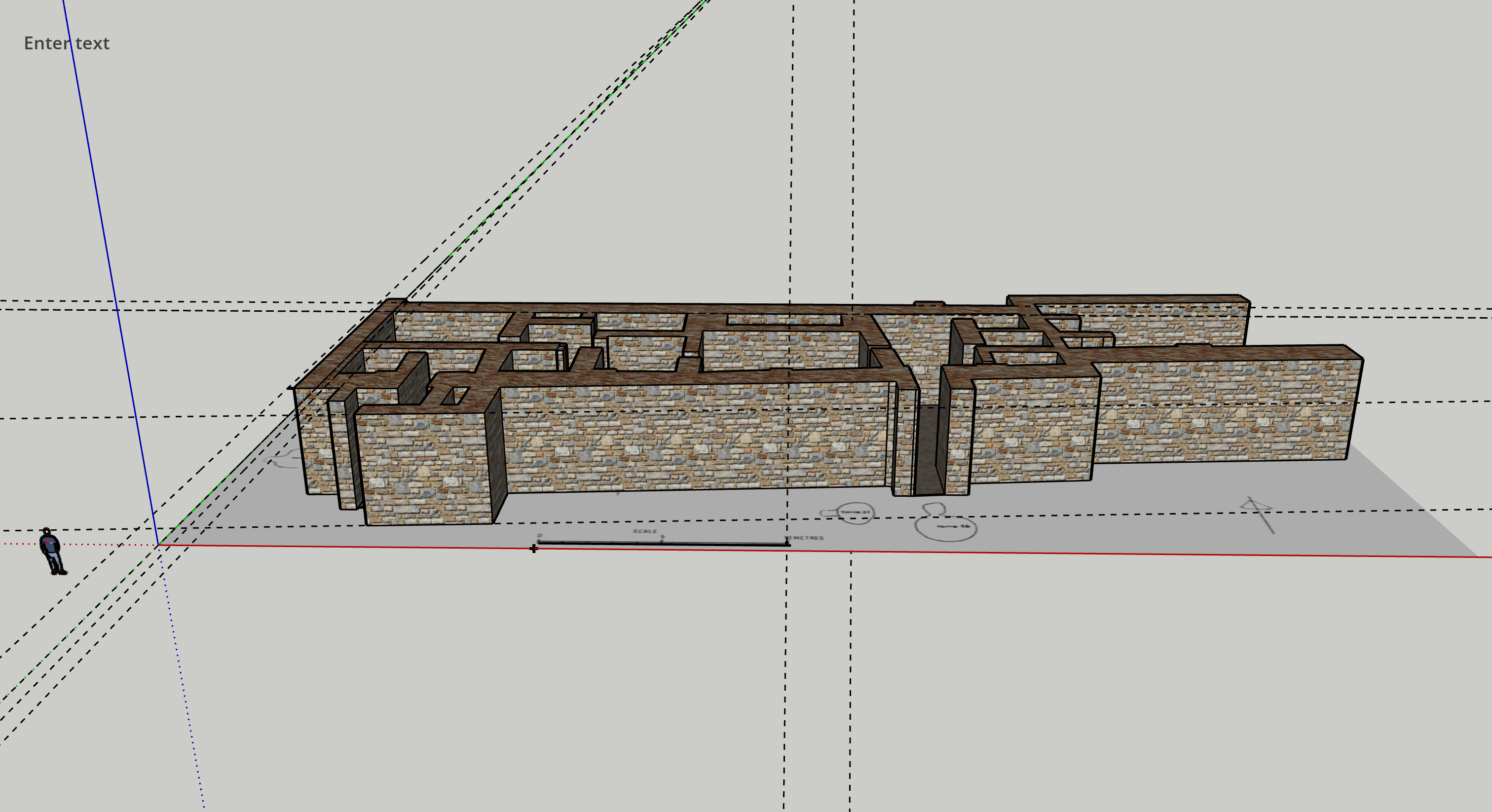
3D reconstruction of the ashlar limestone outer wall of the fortress at Enkomi

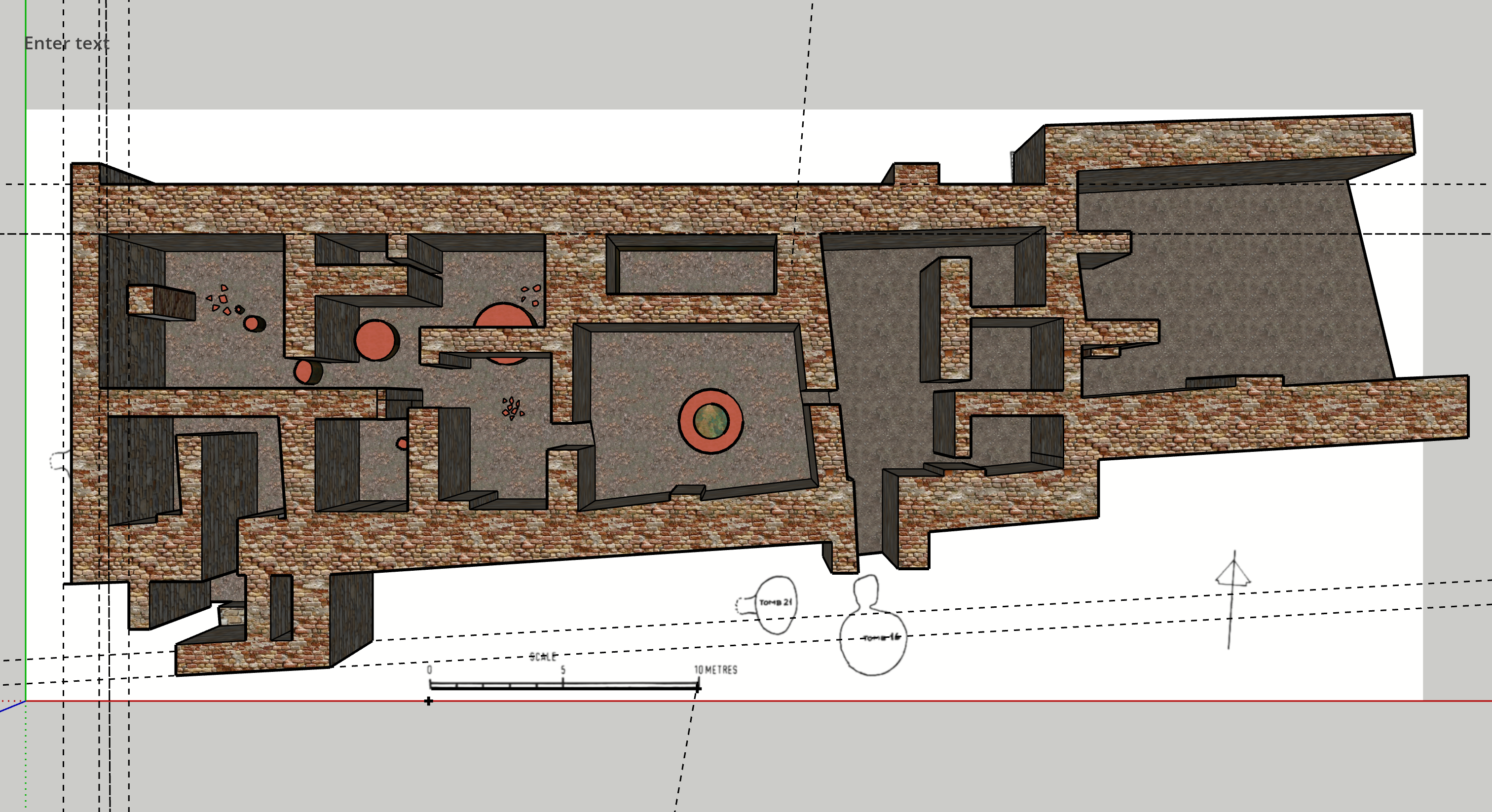
The internal copper production structure of the Fortress at Enkomi

Enkomi's fortress Level 1A has been identified as part of the Late Cypriot urban defensive system and is represented in excavation plans as a rectangular stone-built enclosure. The fortress's wall used ashlar limestone masonry, which is a feature that was often used in elite-level construction during the Late Bronze Age in Cyprus. The use of stone in the fortress also aligns with the general regional architectural needs that focused on durability, control of movement, and monumentality within the settlement. Fortification with Level I-II occupation (c. 1650 BC – c. 1200 BC) was a period with advanced urbanization and rapidly growing copper production at Enkomi, where Enkomi demonstrated one of the earliest examples of sustained copper production on the island at that time, with the existence of tuyère tubes, crucible fragments, and slag deposits gathering in workshop zones across the settlement. Furthermore, the early phases of the site included copper production, furnace installations beyond the main walled area, and industrial activity, which strongly support the view that fortified architecture may have secured areas for resource storage and industrial security. Additionally, copper was the foundation of Late Bronze Age wealth, military power, and international network, so Enkomi had to secure copper production sites.

== Ashlar Building Level IIIA ==
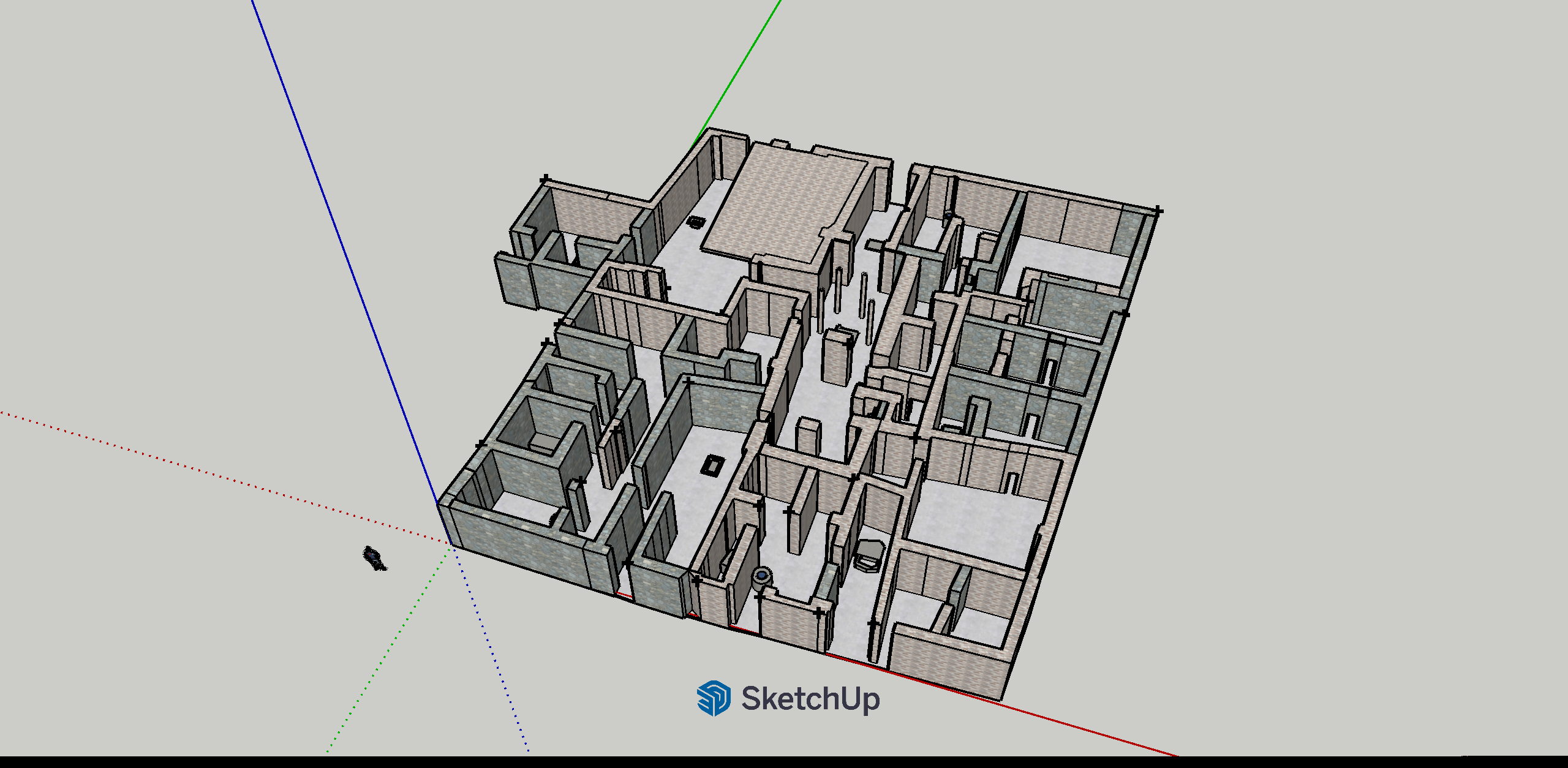
3D reconstruction of Ashlar Building Level IIIA

The Ashlar Building located at the center of the settlement. The building served industrial, ritual, and residential purposes for the local community from the Middle Bronze Age through the Early Iron Age. It represents one of the most extensively excavated areas of the site, with excavations carried out by Schaeffer and Dikaios until the 1970s.

During Level IIIA, the building measured approximately 32.5 by 28.5 metres (107 by 94 ft) at its base, split in 38 rooms and covering roughly 930 m^{2} (10,000 sq ft). Archaeological evidence suggests that the structure may have been multi-storied in some areas, as indicated by surviving stairways in Rooms 13 and 28. A single storey is estimated to have reached at least 1.5 metres (4.9 ft) in height. The building was constructed using ashlar masonry, consisting of large-grained rubble and finely cut blocks set within a mudbrick superstructure. Materials from the previously destructed level were also reused in the construction.

The central space, Room 14, contains a large hearth surrounded by four ashlar columns, suggesting its use for ritual or ceremonial activities. A short staircase connects this room to Room 64, which features a covered area and direct access to the street nearby.

While the northern part mostly served the community, the southern part of the building functioned as an industrial zone, as evidenced by the discovery of multiple wells, hearths, and benches.

== See also ==
- Hala Sultan Tekke
- Idalion
- Kourion
- Kition
- List of cities of the ancient Near East
