= Vladimir Sergeyevich Sergeyev =

Soviet historian (1883-1941)

Vladimir Sergeyevich Sergeyev (Russian: Владимир Серге́евич Сергеев) (28 June [O.S. 16 June] 1883 - 8 January 1941 in Moscow) was a Soviet historian of classical antiquity.

During 1934-41 Sergeev served as the head of Department of Ancient History at the Moscow State University and the Moscow Institute of Philosophy, Literature, and History. During 1936-41 worked in the Institute of History Soviet Academy of Sciences. Sergeev concentrated on the history of Ancient Greece and Ancient Rome and was author of the first Soviet textbooks about this topic.

== Selected works ==
- Очерки по истории Древнего Рима (Essays on the History of Ancient Rome), (2 parts), 1938.
- История Древней Греции (History of Ancient Greece), 1939.
