= List of Italian-American Medal of Honor recipients =

The following is a list of Italian-American soldiers, sailors, airmen and marines who were awarded the American military's highest decoration — the Medal of Honor. The Medal of Honor is bestowed "for conspicuous gallantry and intrepidity at the risk of life, above and beyond the call of duty, in actual combat against an armed enemy force." The medal is awarded by the President of the United States on behalf of the Congress.

== Medal of Honor ==
The Medal of Honor was created during the American Civil War and is the highest military decoration presented by the United States government to a member of its armed forces. The recipient must have distinguished themselves at the risk of their own life above and beyond the call of duty in action against an enemy of the United States. Due to the nature of this medal, it is commonly presented posthumously.

== Civil War ==
Luigi Palma di Cesnola
Rank and organization: Colonel, 4th New York Cavalry
Date and place of action: 17 June 1863, Battle of Aldie, Virginia
Entered service at: New York, New York
Date and place of birth: 29 June 1832, Rivarola, Piedmont, Italy

== Indian Wars ==
George Ferrari
Rank and organization: Corporal, 8th U.S. Cavalry
Date and place of action: 23 September 1869, Red Creek, Arizona Territory
Entered service at: Cleveland, Ohio
Date and place of birth: 1845, New York City, New York

== Spanish–American War ==
Frank O. Fournia
Rank and organization: Private, Company H, 21st U.S. Infantry
Date and place of action: 1 July 1898, Santiago, Cuba
Entered service at: Plattsburgh, New York
Date and place of birth: January 1873, Rome, New York

== World War I ==
Michael Valente
Rank and organization: Private, United States Army, Company D, 107th Infantry, 27th Division
Date and place of action: 29 September 1918, east of Ronssoy, France
Entered service at: Ogdensburg, New York
Date and place of birth: 5 February 1895, Cassino, Italy

== World War II ==
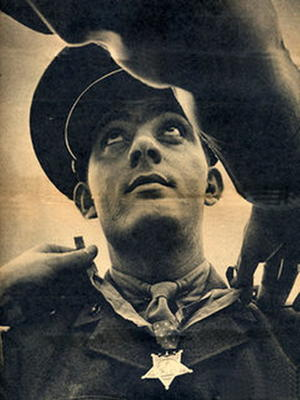
John Basilone

John Basilone
Rank and organization: Sergeant, United States Marine Corps, 1st Battalion, 7th Marines, 1st Marine Division
Date and place of action: 24 and 25 October 1942, Lunga Area, Guadalcanal, Solomon Islands
Entered service at: New Jersey
Date and place of birth: 4 November 1916, Buffalo, New York

Vito R. Bertoldo
Rank and organization: Master Sergeant, United States Army, Company A, 242nd Infantry, 42nd Infantry Division
Date and place of action: 9 and 10 January 1945, Hatten, France
Entered service at: Decatur, Illinois
Date and place of birth: 1 December 1916, Decatur, Illinois

Willibald C. Bianchi
Rank and organization: First Lieutenant, United States Army, 45th Infantry Regiment (PS), Philippine Scouts
Date and place of action: 3 February 1942, near Bagac, Bataan Province, Philippine Islands
Entered service at: New Ulm, Minnesota
Date and place of birth: New Ulm, Minnesota

Anthony Casamento
Rank and organization: Corporal, United States Marine Corps, Company D, 1st Battalion, 5th Marines, 1st Marine Division
Date and place of action: 1 November 1942, Guadalcanal, Solomon Islands
Entered service at: Brooklyn, New York
Date and place of birth: 16 November 1920, Brooklyn, New York

Ralph Cheli
Rank and organization: Major, United States Army Air Corps
Date and place of action: 18 August 1943, near Wewak, New Guinea
Entered service at: Brooklyn, New York
Date and place of birth: San Francisco, California

Joseph J. Cicchetti
Rank and organization: Private First Class, United States Army, Company A, 148th Infantry, 37th Infantry Division
Date and place of action: 9 February 1945, south Manila, Luzon, Philippine Islands
Entered service at: Waynesburg, Ohio
Date and place of birth: Waynesburg, Ohio

Mike Colalillo
Rank and organization: Private First Class, United States Army, Company C, 398th Infantry, 100th Infantry Division
Date and place of action: 7 April 1945, near Untergriesheim, Germany
Entered service at: Duluth, Minnesota
Date and place of birth: Hibbing, Minnesota

Peter J. Dalessondro
Rank and organization: Technical Sergeant, United States Army, Company E, 39th Infantry, 9th Infantry Division
Date and place of action: 22 December 1944, near Kalterherberg, Germany
Entered service at: Watervliet, New York
Date and place of birth: 19 May 1918, Watervliet, New York

Anthony P. Damato

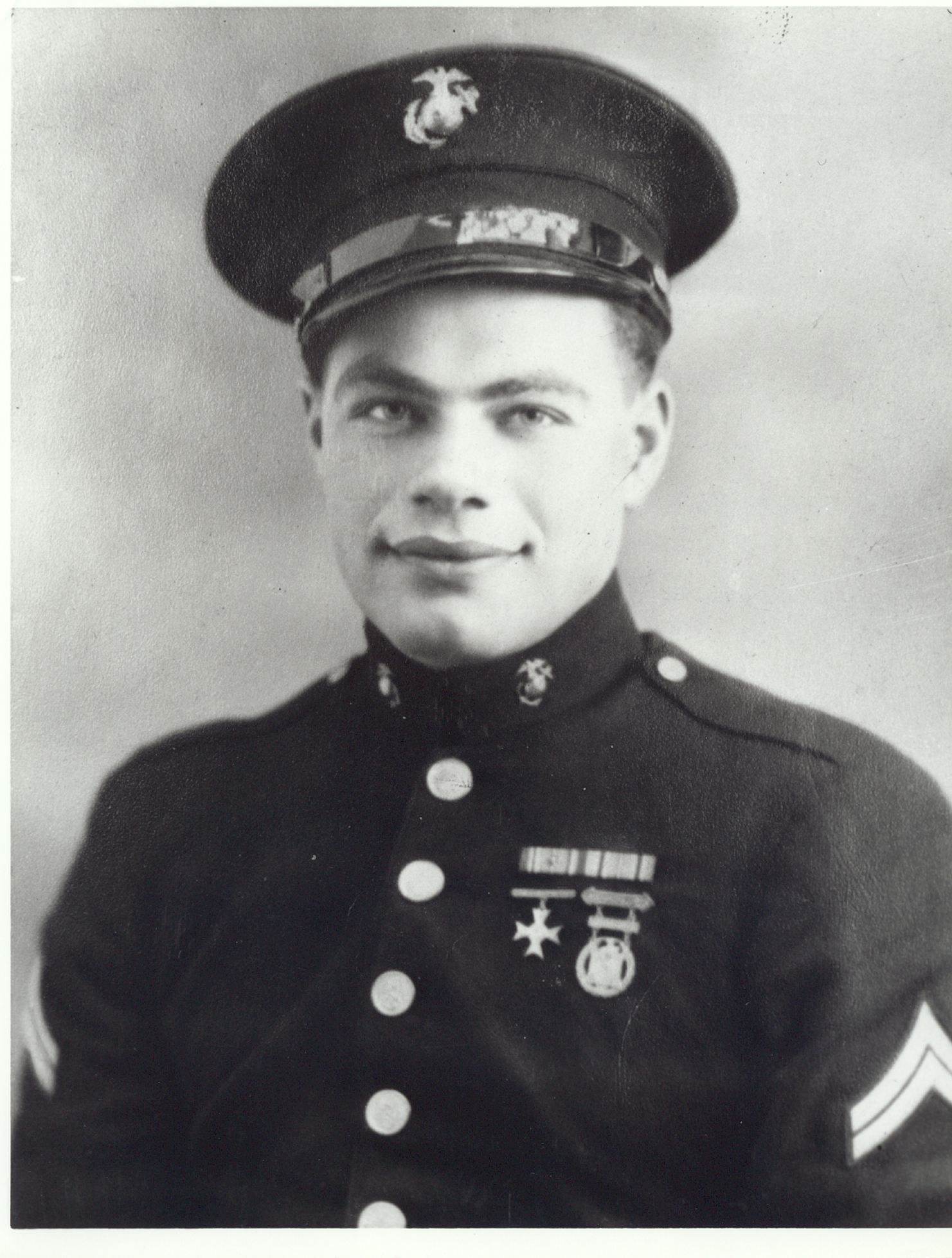
Anthony P. Damato

Rank and organization: Corporal, United States Marine Corps
Date and place of action: 19 and 20 February 1944, Engebi Island, Eniwetok Atoll, Marshall Islands
Entered service at: Pennsylvania
Date and place of birth: 28 March 1922, Shenandoah, Pennsylvania

Arthur F. DeFranzo
Rank and organization: Staff Sergeant, United States Army, 1st Infantry Division
Date and place of action: 10 June 1944, near Vaubadon, France
Entered service at: Saugus, Massachusetts
Date and place of birth: Saugus, Massachusetts

Gino J. Merli
Rank and organization: Private First Class, United States Army, 18th Infantry, 1st Infantry Division
Date and place of action: 4 and 5 September 1944, near Sars la Bruyere, Belgium
Entered service at: Peckville, Pennsylvania
Date and place of birth: Scranton, Pennsylvania

Frank J. Petrarca
Rank and organization: Private First Class, United States Army, Medical Detachment, 145th Infantry, 37th Infantry Division
Date and place of action: 27 July 1943, Horseshoe Hill, New Georgia, Solomon Islands
Entered service at: Cleveland, Ohio
Date and place of birth: Cleveland, Ohio

Robert M. Viale
Second Lieutenant, United States Army, Company K, 148th Infantry, 37th Infantry Division
Date and place of action: 5 February 1945, Manila, Luzon, Philippine Islands
Entered service at: Ukiah, California
Date and place of birth: Bayside, California

== Korean War ==
Reginald B. Desiderio
Rank and organization: Captain, United States Army, commanding officer, Company E, 27th Infantry Regiment, 25th Infantry Division
Date and place of action: Near Ipsok, Korea, 27 November 1950
Entered service at: Gilroy, California
Date and place of birth: 12 September 1918, Clairton, Pennsylvania

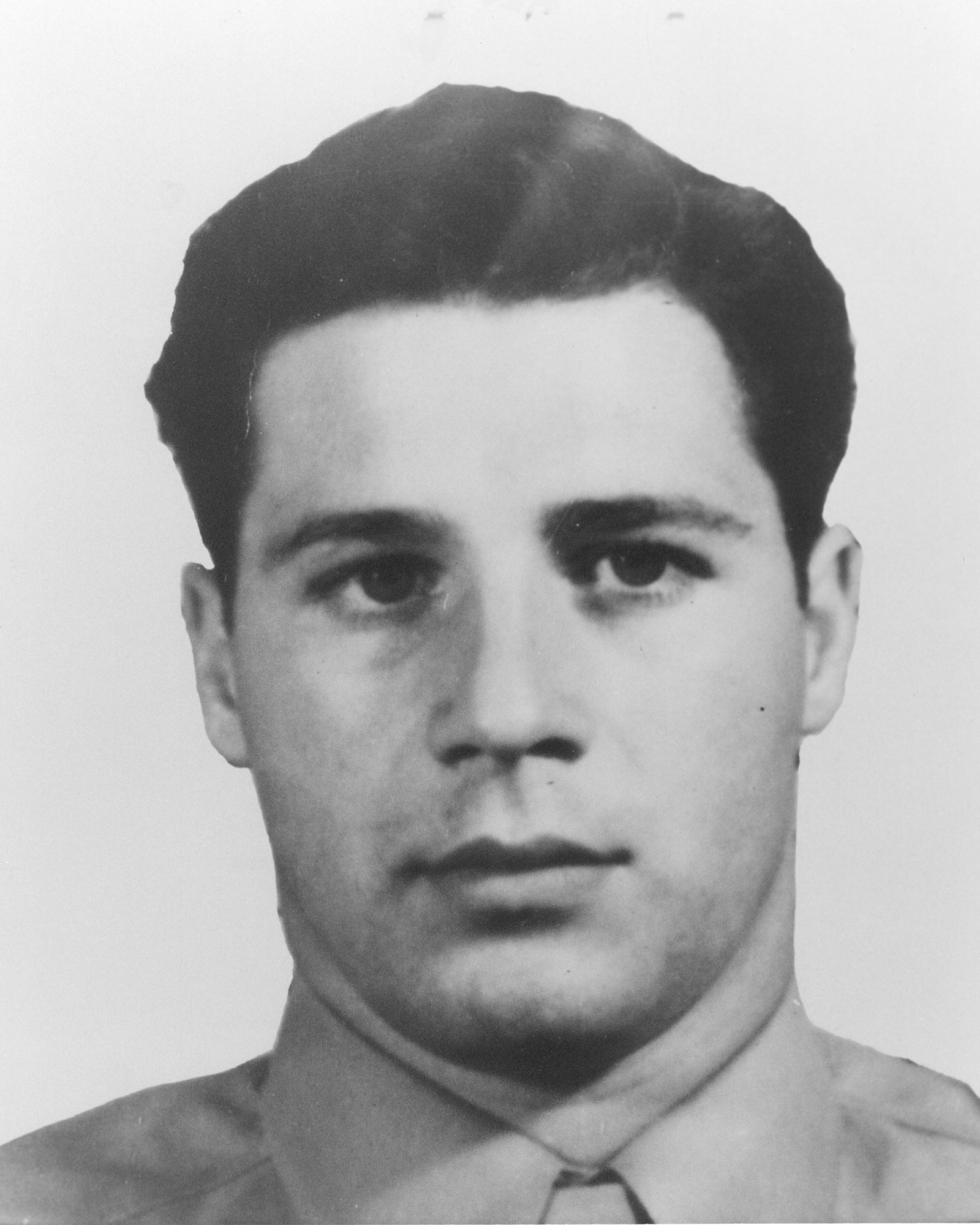
Joseph Vittori

Joseph Vittori
Rank and organization: Corporal, United States Marine Corps Reserve, Company F, 2nd Battalion, 1st Marines, 1st Marine Division (Reinforced)
Date and place of action: 15 and 16 September 1951, Hill 749, Korea
Entered service at: Beverly, Massachusetts
Date and place of birth: 1 August 1929, Beverly, Massachusetts

== Vietnam War ==
Lewis Albanese
Rank and organization: Private First Class, United States Army, Company B, 5th Battalion (Airmobile), 7th Cavalry Regiment, 1st Cavalry Division
Date and place of action: 1 December 1966, Republic of Vietnam
Entered service at: Seattle, Washington
Date and place of birth: 27 April 1946, Cornedo Vicentino - Province of Vicenza, Italy

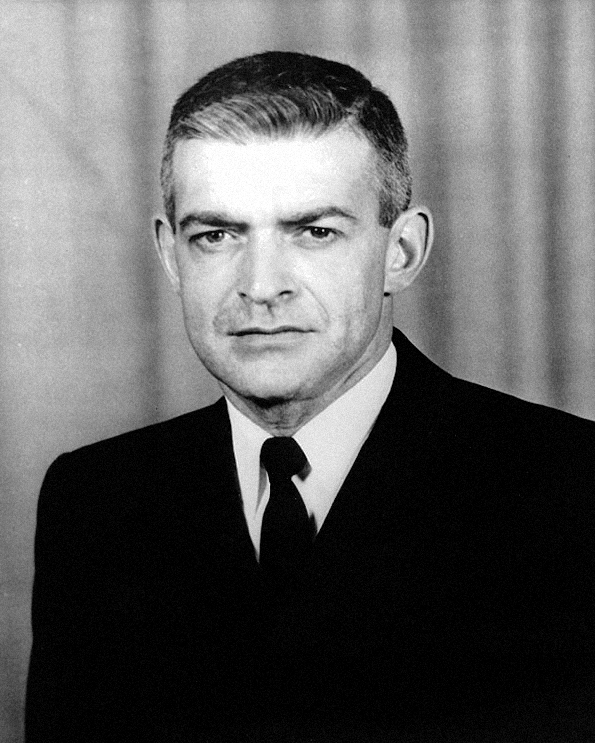
Vincent R. Capodanno

Vincent R. Capodanno
Rank and organization: Lieutenant, United States Navy, Chaplain Corps, 3rd Battalion, 5th Marines, 1st Marine Division (Reinforced), FMF
Date and place of action: 4 September 1967, Quang Tin Province, Republic of Vietnam
Entered service at: Staten Island, New York
Date and place of birth: 13 February 1929, Staten Island, New York

Jon R. Cavaiani
Rank and organization: Staff Sergeant, United States Army, Vietnam Training Advisory Group
Date and place of action: 4 and 5 June 1971, Republic of Vietnam
Entered service at: Fresno, California
Date and place of birth: 2 August 1943, Royston, England

Frank R. Fratellenico
Rank and organization: Corporal, United States Army, Company B, 2nd Battalion, 502nd Infantry, 1st Brigade, 101st Airborne Division
Date and place of action: 19 August 1970, Quang Tri Province, Republic of Vietnam
Entered service at: Albany, New York
Date and place of birth: 14 July 1951, Sharon, Connecticut

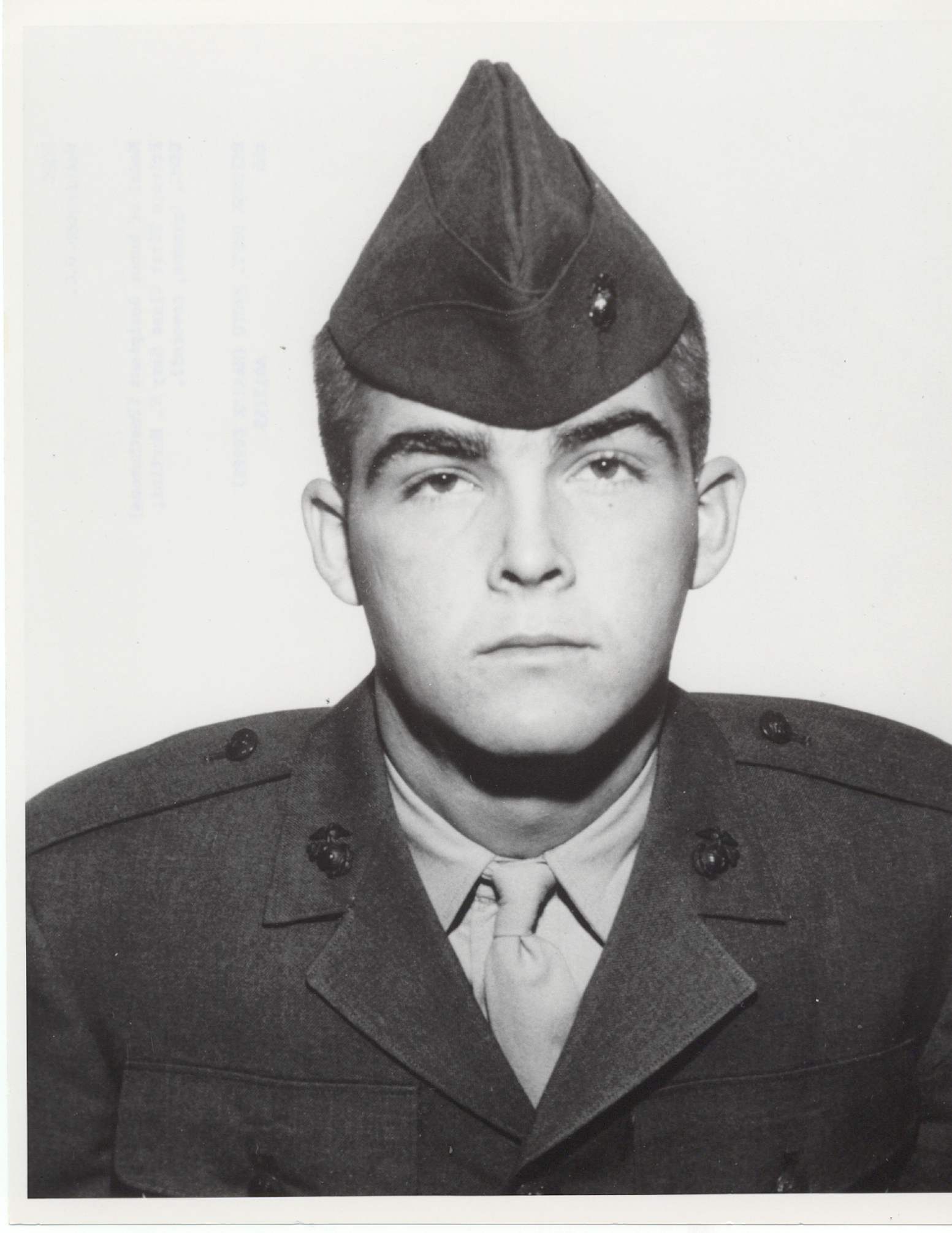
Gary W. Martini

Gary W. Martini
Rank and organization: Private First Class, United States Marine Corps, Company F, 2nd Battalion, 1st Marines, 1st Marine Division
Date and place of action: 21 April 1967, Binh Son, Republic of Vietnam
Entered service at: Portland, Oregon
Date and place of birth: 21 September 1948, Lexington, Virginia

Louis R. Rocco
Rank and organization: Sergeant First Class, United States Army, Advisory Team 162, Military Assistance Command
Date and place of action: 24 May 1970, northeast of Katum, Republic of Vietnam
Entered service at: Los Angeles, California
Date and place of birth: 19 November 1938, Albuquerque, New Mexico

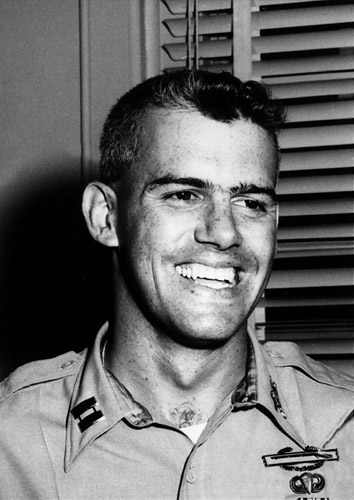
Humbert R. Versace

Humbert R. Versace
Rank and organization: Captain, United States Army, Detachment A-23, 5th Special Forces Group, Army Special Forces, Intelligence Advisor to Military Assistance Advisory Group, Ca Mau, Republic of Vietnam
Date and place of action: 29 October 1963 to 26 September 1965, Vietnam
Entered service at: Norfolk, Virginia
Date and place of birth: 2 July 1937, Honolulu, Hawaii

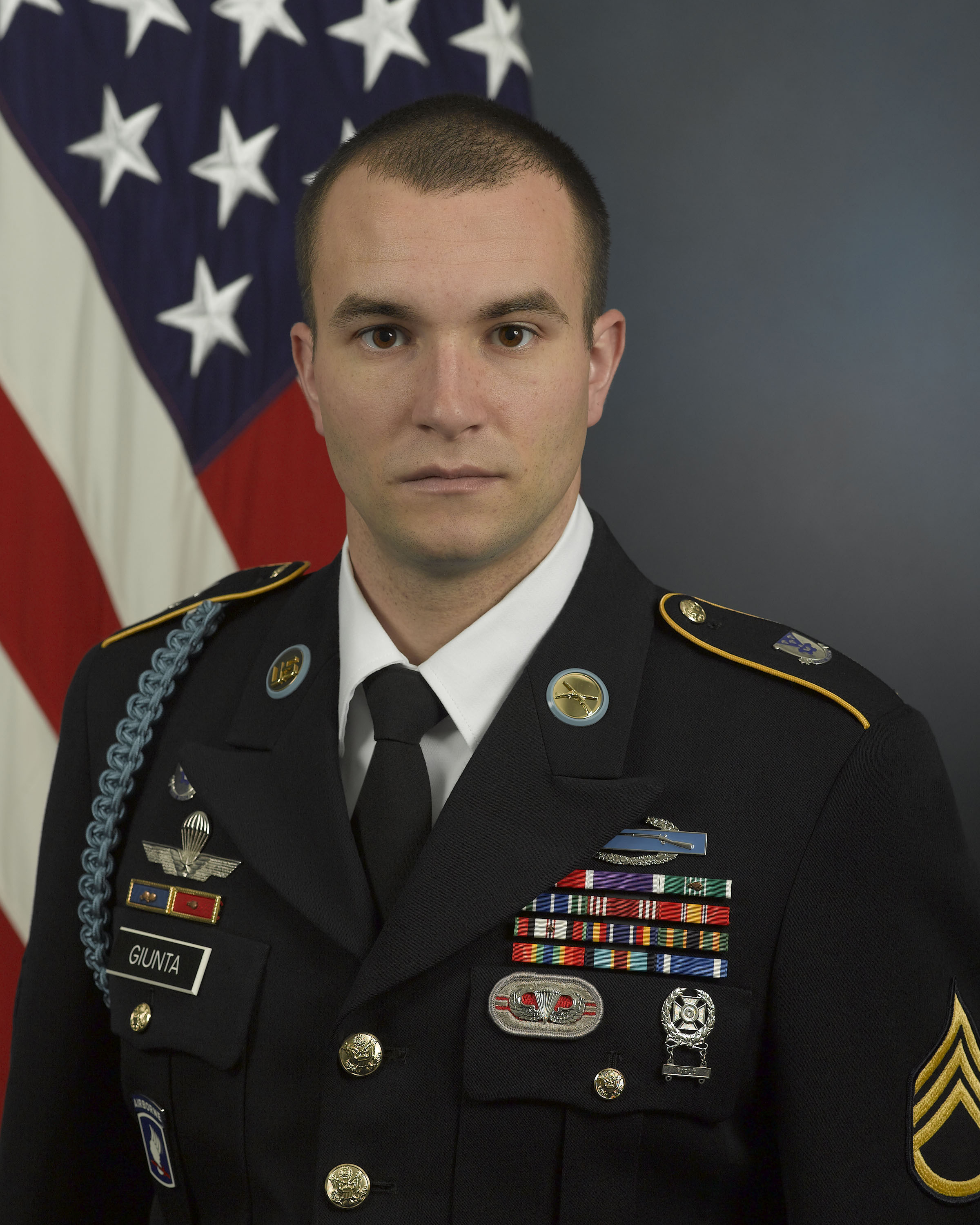
Salvatore A. Giunta

== War in Afghanistan ==
Jared C. Monti
Rank and organization: Sergeant First Class, United States Army, 3rd Squadron, 71st Cavalry, 3rd Brigade Combat Team, 10th Mountain Division
Date and place of action: 21 June 2006, Gowardesh, Nuristan Province, Afghanistan
Entered service at: Fort Sill, Oklahoma
Date and place of birth: 20 September 1975, Abington, Massachusetts

Salvatore Giunta
Rank and organization: Staff Sergeant, United States Army, Company B, 2nd Battalion, 503rd Infantry Regiment, 173rd Airborne Brigade
Date and place of action: 27 October 2007, Korengal Valley, Afghanistan
Entered service at: Fort Benning, Georgia
Date and place of birth: 21 January 1985, Clinton, Iowa

== War in Iraq ==
David Bellavia
Rank and organization: Staff Sergeant, United States Army, 2nd Battalion, 2nd Infantry Regiment, 1st Infantry Division
Date and place of action: November 10, 2004, Fallujah, Iraq
Entered service at: Buffalo, New York
Date and place of birth: 10 November 1975, Buffalo, New York

== See also ==
- List of Medal of Honor recipients
- List of Italian Americans
