= Joe Frazier (disambiguation) =

Joe Frazier (1944–2011) was an American pro-boxer;

Joe Frazier may also refer to:

- Joe Frazier (baseball) (1922-2011)
- Joe Frazier (1937–2014), singer, member of The Chad Mitchell Trio (1960-66)
- Joe "Speedo" Frazier (1943–2014), lead singer of The Impalas (1958-61)

== See also ==
- Joe Fraser (born 1998), English gymnast
- Jo Fraser (born 1986), Scottish painter
- Joseph Frazier Wall (1920–1995), American historian
- Lynn Joseph Frazier (1874–1947), American politician
- John Walker (Medal of Honor), also known as Joseph Frazier
