= Lewis Albanese =

US Army Medal of Honor recipient (1946–1966)

- Medal of Honor recipient
- Born: April 27, 1946; Cornedo Vicentino, Vicenza, Italy
- Died: December 1, 1966 (aged 20); Binh Dinh Province, Republic of Vietnam
- Burial place: Evergreen-Washelli Memorial Park and Funeral Home, Seattle Washington
- Military career
- Allegiance: United States
- Branch: United States Army
- Service years: 1965–1966
- Rank: Private First Class
- Units: 7th Cavalry Regiment, 1st Cavalry Division
- Conflicts: Vietnam War (DOW)
- Awards: Medal of Honor; Purple Heart

Lewis Albanese (April 27, 1946 – December 1, 1966), born Luigi Albanese, was an Italian-born United States Army Private First Class who posthumously received the Medal of Honor for his actions during the Vietnam War.

Born in Italy, Albanese immigrated to the United States as a young child with his parents and was drafted into the Army in 1965 after graduating from high school. During an exercise in the Republic of Vietnam, Albanese's platoon was under heavy fire from North Vietnamese positions. Albanese then bayonet charged his way to an enclosed sniper position, killing eight snipers before being mortally wounded.

== Biography ==
Lewis Albanese (in Italian Luigi) was born in Cornedo Vicentino, Vicenza, Italy and graduated from Franklin High School in Seattle, Washington in 1964. He briefly worked for Boeing before being drafted into the Army on 26 October 1965. Albanese received basic training with B Co 1st Bn 11th Inf at Fort Carson, Colorado and was sent to Vietnam in August 1966 as part of the 7th Cavalry attached to the 1st Cavalry Division.

In December 1966, while on patrol in Binh Dinh Province, Republic of Vietnam with Company B of the 5th Battalion, Albanese's unit received heavy fire from concealed enemy positions. During an attempted encirclement of the platoon by the Vietnamese forces, Albanese fixed a bayonet to his weapon and charged the enemy positions. Upon arriving and momentarily silencing the enemy fire, Albanese discovered that the ditch he had charged was a well-entrenched position. He continued 100 meters through the position, killing at least eight enemy snipers despite running out of ammunition, being forced to fight hand to hand, and being mortally wounded.

Albanese's actions enabled his unit to advance further, and he posthumously received the Medal of Honor, which was presented to his family at the Pentagon by Secretary of the Army Stanley Rogers Resor on February 16, 1968. Albanese is buried in Evergreen-Washelli Memorial Park and Funeral Home in Seattle, Washington. His name is found on Panel 12E, Row 131 of the Vietnam War Memorial.

In 2014, Cornedo Vicentino, Italy named a street in Albanese's honor.

== Awards and decorations ==
PFC Albanese Revived the following awards for his service

Badge	Combat Infantryman Badge		
1st row	Medal of Honor	Purple Heart	Army Good Conduct Medal
2nd row	National Defense Service Medal	Vietnam Service Medal with 1 Campaign star	Vietnam Campaign Medal
Unit awards	Republic of Vietnam Gallantry Cross Unit Citation with Palm		

Military Merit Medal

South Vietnam

== See also ==
- List of Medal of Honor recipients
- List of Medal of Honor recipients for the Vietnam War
- List of Italian American Medal of Honor recipients
