= Tympanum =

Tympanum may refer to:

- Tympanum (architecture), an architectural element located within the arch or pediment
- Tympanum (anatomy), a hearing organ/gland in frogs and toads, a flat red oval on both sides of a frog's head
- Tympanum, in biology, the eardrum
- Tympanum, or tympanal organ, a hearing organ in insects
- Tympanum (hand drum), a percussion instrument in ancient Greece and Rome
- Timpano, in music, singular of timpani, a kettledrum
- Sakia or saqiya, in Latin "tympanum", a water-raising device
- Larnaca Tympanum, a medieval sculpture

== See also ==
- Tympanic (disambiguation)
