= Anthony Casamento =

US Marine Corps Medal of Honor recipient (1920–1987)

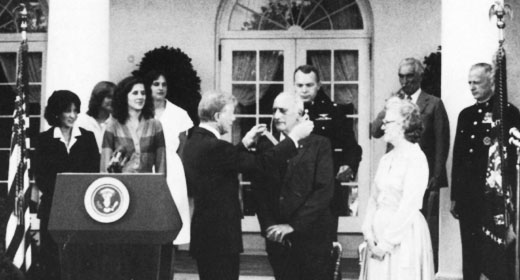
- Casamento receiving the Medal of Honor from President Jimmy Carter at the White House
- Born: November 16, 1920; New York City, U.S.
- Died: July 18, 1987 (aged 66); Northport, New York, U.S.
- Burial place: Long Island National Cemetery
- Military career
- Allegiance: United States of America
- Branch: United States Marine Corps
- Service years: 1940–1946
- Rank: Corporal
- Unit: 1st Battalion 5th Marines
- Conflicts: World War II; Battle of Guadalcanal
- Awards: Medal of Honor; Purple Heart

Anthony Casamento (November 16, 1920 – July 18, 1987) was a United States Marine who received the Medal of Honor in 1980 for his actions during the Battle of Guadalcanal in 1942.

== Biography ==
Casamento was born November 16, 1920, in Manhattan, New York. He enlisted in the Marine Corps on August 19, 1940, in New York City. After completing recruit training at the Marine Corps Recruit Depot Parris Island, South Carolina, he was assigned to the 5th Marines, 1st Marine Division.

== Military career ==
Six months after the Japanese attack on Pearl Harbor, the 5th Marines was on its way to the southwest Pacific to take part in the initial invasion of Japanese-held territory as part of the 1st Marine Division. The Marine landing on Guadalcanal began in August 1942 and Cpl Casamento made the assault with Company D, 1st Battalion, 5th Marines.

On November 1, 1942, while serving as a leader of a machine gun squad in an attack on Japanese positions, Cpl Casamento's Marines came under heavy enemy fire near the Matanikau River. During the ensuing battle, all members of the unit were either killed or severely wounded. Despite his own multiple wounds, Cpl Casamento continued to provide supporting fire and heroically held the enemy at bay, thereby protecting the flanks of adjoining companies until he was physically unable to continue.

== Post-war ==
Corporal Casamento was treated at a medical aid station, then shipped back to the United States and admitted to the naval hospital in Oakland, California.

In 1964, it was learned that two eyewitnesses to Cpl Casamento's heroism were still alive. That set in motion a chain of events that would ultimately result in his receiving the Medal of Honor in 1980.

Corporal Casamento died July 18, 1987, in the VA hospital in Northport, New York, after a long illness.

== Decorations ==
In addition to the Medal of Honor, Cpl Casamento's awards include the Purple Heart, the Presidential Unit Citation, the American Defense Service Medal, the American Campaign Medal, the Asiatic-Pacific Medal with two bronze stars (for Guadalcanal-Tulagi Landings and Capture and Defense of Guadalcanal), and the World War II Victory Medal

1st row	Medal of Honor	Purple Heart	Combat Action Ribbon
2nd row	Presidential Unit Citation	Marine Corps Good Conduct Medal	American Defense Service Medal
3rd row	American Campaign Medal	Asiatic-Pacific Campaign Medal with 2 Campaign stars	World War II Victory Medal

== Medal of Honor citation ==
The President of the United States in the name of The Congress takes pleasure in presenting the MEDAL OF HONOR to

CORPORAL ANTHONY CASAMENTO
UNITED STATES MARINE CORPS

for service as set forth in the following CITATION:

For conspicuous gallantry and intrepidity at the risk of his life above and beyond the call of duty while serving with Company "D", First Battalion, Fifth Marines, First Marine Division on Guadalcanal, British Solomon Islands, in action against the enemy Japanese forces on November 1, 1942. Serving as a leader of a machine gun section, Corporal Casamento directed his unit to advance along a ridge near the Matanikau River where they engaged the enemy. He positioned his section to provide covering fire for two flanking units and to provide direct support for the main force of his company which was behind him. During the course of this engagement, all members of his section were either killed or severely wounded and he himself suffered multiple, grievous wounds. Nonetheless, Corporal Casamento continued to provide critical supporting fire for the attack and in defense of his position. Following the loss of all effective personnel, he set up, loaded, and manned his unit's machine gun, tenaciously holding the enemy forces at bay. Corporal Casamento single-handedly engaged and destroyed one machine gun emplacement to his front and took under fire the other emplacement on the flank. Despite the heat and ferocity of the engagement, he continued to man his own weapon and repeatedly repulsed multiple assaults by the enemy forces, thereby protecting the flanks of the adjoining companies and holding his position until the arrival of his main attacking force. Corporal Casamento's courageous fighting spirit, heroic conduct, and unwavering dedication to duty reflected great credit upon himself and were in keeping with the highest traditions of the Marine Corps and the United States Naval Service.

/S/ JIMMY CARTER

== See also ==
- List of Medal of Honor recipients
- List of Medal of Honor recipients for World War II
- List of Italian American Medal of Honor recipients
