= Larnaca Tympanum =

Medieval sculpture found in Cyprus

The Larnaca Tympanum is a medieval sculpture in white marble found at Larnaca in Cyprus in the nineteenth century. It is now in the collection of the V&A in London, registered under the number A.2-1982.

== Discovery and early history ==
The sculpture was found in the 1870s when foundations were being excavated for a house at Larnaca. Subsequently, it was acquired by Alessandro Palma di Cesnola, and given to his father-in-law, Edwin Henry Lawrence, in lieu of his financial support of Cesnola's collections. On 27 April 1892, Augustus Pitt Rivers purchased the sculpture at auction and transferred it to his private museum in Dorset. Most of the collection was moved to Oxford to found the Pitt Rivers Museum. The tympanum, however, remained in Dorset and was sold in the 1980s to the V&A. After the sculpture was acquired by the V&A, it was published in a catalogue by Paul Williamson, one time Keeper of Sculpture, Director of Collections and Acting Deputy Director of that museum. The sculpture is currently on public exhibition in the medieval galleries at the V&A.

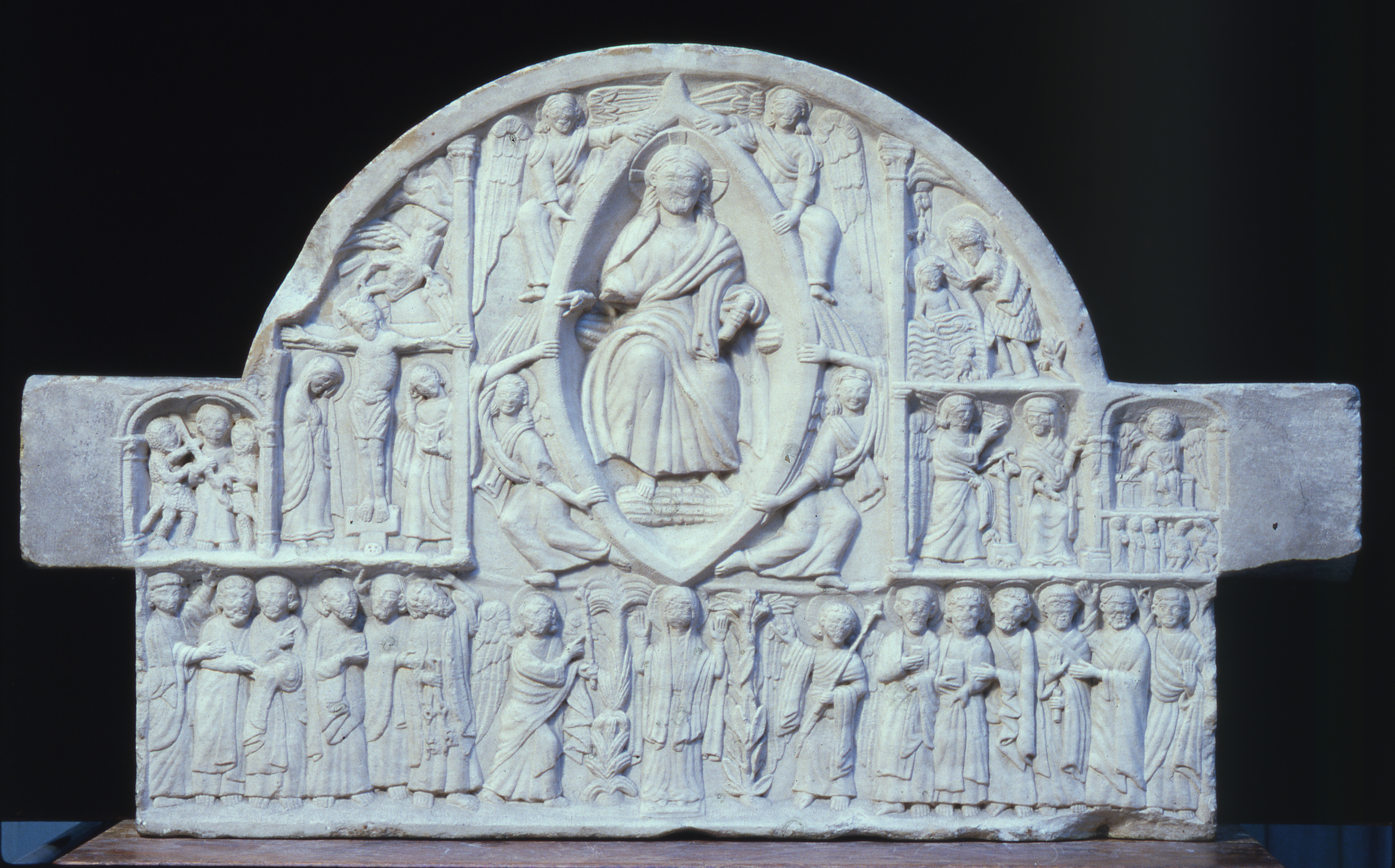
Carved tympanum from Larnaca, Cyprus, circa 1210–30. Now in the V&A, London

== Subject matter and date ==
The sculpture shows Christ in a mandorla, holding a scroll and offering a blessing with his right hand. He is flanked by angels rather than the four Evangelists. Below is the Virgin Mary orans, approached by Michael and Gabriel. On either side, in the bottom register, are the Apostles, among them St. Peter holding the keys to paradise. The subsidiary scenes above include the Crucifixion, the Annunciation, and the Baptism. The Annunciation has drawn particular attention due to the twisted column with serpent heads that is placed between Mary and Archangel Gabriel.

George Hill published the sculpture in his History of Cyprus and saw in it "a work of the Frankish period combining, in true Cypriote fashion, a Byzantine scheme with late details. The fifteenth century seem the most probably date." This view was reassessed by Michael D. Willis who compared the sculpture to work in Tuscany and assigned the piece to early part of the thirteenth century. This date is cited and endorsed by Paul Williamson. The V&A continues to date the sculpture between 1210 and 1230.

In 2000, Paul Hetherington re-examined the sculpture and suggested that the tympanum was a pastiche of the nineteenth century. This view has been reiterated by Paul Stephenson.

== Bibliography ==
A. Palma di Cesnola, Salaminia (Cyprus); The History, Treasures and Antiquities of Salamis in the Island of Cyprus (London, 1882), p. 108 and pl. IX

C. Enlart, L'art gothique et de la Renaissance en Chypre, Paris, 1899, vol. 1, pp. 15–16, translated as Camille Enlart, Gothic Art and the Renaissance in Cyprus. (London: Trigraph/A. G. Leventis Foundation, 1987)

George Hill, A History of Cyprus, 4 vols. (Cambridge: University Press, 1940–52)

Adrian J. Boas, Crusader Archaeology: The Material Culture of the Latin East (London; New York: Routledge, 1999), incorrectly recording the sculpture as still in Farham in Dorset.

T. S. R. Boase, "v. The Arts in Cyprus, Ecclesiastical Art," in K. M. Setton (ed.), A History of the Crusades (Madison, 1977), vol. IV, p. 186

Paul Hetherington, "The Larnaka Tympanum and its origins: a persisting problem from 19th century Cyprus," in Report of the Department of Antiquities, Cyprus, 2000 (Nicosia, 2000), pp. 361–378
