= Tympanic =

Tympanic may mean:

- Tympanic nerve
- Tympanic bone
- Tympanic muscle

== See also ==
- Tympanum (disambiguation)
