= Louis R. Rocco =

U.S. Army soldier and Medal of Honor receiver

Louis Richard Rocco
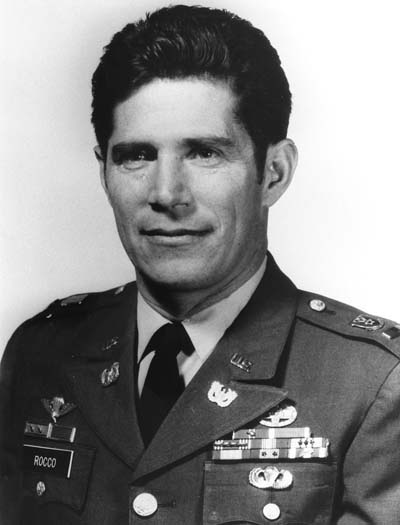
- Louis R. Rocco, Medal of Honor recipient
- Born: November 19, 1938; Albuquerque, New Mexico, U.S.
- Died: October 31, 2002 (aged 63); San Antonio, Texas, U.S.
- Burial place: Fort Sam Houston National Cemetery San Antonio, Texas
- Military career
- Allegiance: United States of America
- Branch: United States Army
- Service years: 1955-1978, 1991-1992
- Rank: Chief Warrant Officer Two
- Unit: Advisory Team 162, U.S. Military Assistance Command
- Conflicts: Vietnam War
- Awards: Medal of Honor; Bronze Star; Purple Heart

Chief Warrant Officer Two Louis Richard Rocco (November 19, 1938 – October 31, 2002) was a United States Army soldier who received the Medal of Honor—the United States' highest military decoration—for his actions near the village of Katum, in the Republic of Vietnam, during the Vietnam War. Despite being wounded, Rocco saved three comrades from a burning helicopter.

== Biography ==
=== Early years ===
Born on November 19, 1938, in Albuquerque, New Mexico, Rocco was the third of nine children born to Louis Rocco, an Italian American, and Lita Rocco, a Mexican-American. In 1948, the family moved to a housing project in the San Fernando Valley and later to a barrio called Wilmington. He joined a local gang and was frequently in trouble with the law. Rocco dropped out of high school and, in 1954, when he was 16 years old, was arrested for armed robbery.

Rocco was in court for his sentencing and during a break he walked into a United States Army recruiter's office. The recruiting officer, Sergeant Martinez, accompanied Rocco to the court and spoke to the judge. The judge gave him a suspended sentence and told him that he could join the Army when he was 17 if he stayed in school, obeyed a curfew and shunned his gang.

Rocco joined the Army in 1955 and, after completing his basic training, was sent to Germany. He earned his high school general equivalency diploma during his tour there.

A few years later, Rocco was serving as a medic at Fort MacArthur in San Pedro, California, when he spotted his recruiter, Sgt. Martinez, lying badly wounded on a litter. Rocco ensured that the sergeant received special attention and constant care.

=== Vietnam War ===
Rocco served two tours of duty in the Republic of Vietnam during the Vietnam War. His first tour was from 1965 to 1966. In 1969, Rocco, who was by then a sergeant first class, returned for another tour of duty in Vietnam and was assigned to Advisory Team 162 of the U.S. Military Assistance Command.

On May 24, 1970, Rocco volunteered to accompany a medical evacuation team on an urgent mission to pick up eight critically wounded Army of the Republic of Vietnam (ARVN) soldiers near Katum Camp. The helicopter in which the team was riding came under heavy fire as it approached the landing zone. The pilot was shot in the leg and the helicopter crashed into a field. Under intense fire, Rocco was able to carry each of the unconscious crash survivors to the ARVN perimeter. Despite having suffered a fractured wrist and hip and a severely bruised back, he was able to help administer first aid to his wounded comrades before collapsing and losing consciousness.

Lieutenant Lee Caubareaux, the helicopter's co-pilot, later lobbied for Rocco to receive the Medal of Honor. On December 12, 1974, President Gerald Ford formally presented Rocco with the medal during a ceremony at the White House.

== Medal of Honor ==
Medal of Honor citation:

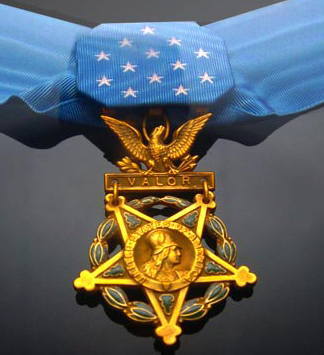

LOUIS R. ROCCO
Rank and organization: Warrant Officer (then Sergeant First Class), U.S. Army, Advisory Team 162, U.S. Military Assistance Command.
Place and date:Northeast of Katum, Republic of Vietnam, May 24, 1970
Entered service at:Los Angeles, California
Born:November 19, 1938, Albuquerque, New Mexico
Citation:

WO Rocco distinguished himself when he volunteered to accompany a medical evacuation team on an urgent mission to evacuate 8 critically wounded Army of the Republic of Vietnam personnel. As the helicopter approached the landing zone, it became the target for intense enemy automatic weapons fire. Disregarding his own safety, WO Rocco identified and placed accurate suppressive fire on the enemy positions as the aircraft descended toward the landing zone. Sustaining major damage from the enemy fire, the aircraft was forced to crash land, causing WO Rocco to sustain a fractured wrist and hip and a severely bruised back. Ignoring his injuries, he extracted the survivors from the burning wreckage, sustaining burns to his own body. Despite intense enemy fire, WO Rocco carried each unconscious man across approximately 20 meters of exposed terrain to the Army of the Republic of Vietnam perimeter. On each trip, his severely burned hands and broken wrist caused excruciating pain, but the lives of the unconscious crash survivors were more important than his personal discomfort, and he continued his rescue efforts. Once inside the friendly position, WO Rocco helped administer first aid to his wounded comrades until his wounds and burns caused him to collapse and lose consciousness. His bravery under fire and intense devotion to duty were directly responsible for saving 3 of his fellow soldiers from certain death. His unparalleled bravery in the face of enemy fire, his complete disregard for his own pain and injuries, and his performance were far above and beyond the call of duty and were in keeping with the highest traditions of self-sacrifice and courage of the military service.

== Later years ==
Rocco made a career of the Army and earned an associate degree. He was a member of the United States Army Physician Assistant Program, class number one in 1972. He retired from the military in 1978 as a Chief Warrant Officer Two.

Returning to New Mexico, Rocco was named director of New Mexico's Veterans Service Commission. During his tenure, he established the Vietnam Veterans of New Mexico organization, opened a Veterans' Center which provided peer counseling to Vietnam veterans, started a shelter for the homeless and a nursing home for veterans, and persuaded New Mexico legislators and voters to waive tuition for all veterans at state colleges.

Rocco returned to active duty in 1991 during the Gulf War and was stationed at Fort Sam Houston in San Antonio, Texas, where he trained medical personnel. When he returned home, he met his fourth wife, Maria Chavez Schneider, an assistant director of New Mexico AIDS Services. The couple lived in San Miguel de Allende, Mexico, from 1992 until 1998, when they moved to San Antonio, Texas. On July 11, 2000, Rocco was appointed the new Deputy State Director for Texas in San Antonio. He became instrumental in promoting Veterans Against Drugs, a nationwide school program.

In 2002, Rocco was diagnosed with terminal lung cancer; he died at his San Antonio home on October 31 of that year. He was buried with full military honors at Fort Sam Houston National Cemetery in San Antonio. He had two sons and a daughter.

The local government of San Antonio honored Rocco by naming a youth center the Louis Rocco Youth & Family Center. The Army Aviation Association of America (AAAA) offers a scholarship named in his honor.

On October 31, 2011, Rocco's duplicate Medal of Honor was stolen from his widow's San Antonio home. The original medal was given to his oldest son at his funeral. After a visit to her husband's grave on the ninth anniversary of his death, Maria Rocco returned home to find her house burglarized. The thieves took a number of electronic items as well as the medal.

== Awards and recognitions ==
Rocco's decorations were the following: (Missing are Southwest Asia Service Medal and either the Kuwait Liberation Medal (Saudi Arabian Version) OR Kuwait Liberation Medal (Kuwait Version)

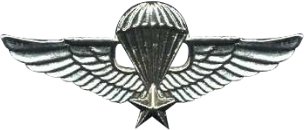

Badge	Combat Medical Badge		
1st row	Medal of Honor	Bronze Star with one Oak leaf cluster	Purple Heart
2nd Row	Army Good Conduct Medal with bronze clasp and four loops (4 awards)	National Defense Service Medal with one Service star	Vietnam Service Medal with three Campaign stars
3rd Row	Vietnam Armed Forces Honor Medal; Second Class	Vietnam Gallantry Cross with palm	Vietnam Campaign Medal with "60-" clasp
Badges	Parachutist badge		South Vietnamese Parachutist badge

== See also ==
- List of Medal of Honor recipients for the Vietnam War
- List of Hispanic Medal of Honor recipients
- List of Italian American Medal of Honor recipients
