= Katum Camp =

Former U.S. Army base in southern Vietnam

Site information
- Type: Army Base

Location
- Coordinates: 11.667°N 106.216°E

Site history
- Built: 1967
- In use: 1967–71
- Battles/wars: Vietnam War

Garrison information
- Occupants: 25th Infantry Division; 5th Special Forces Group

Katum Airfield
- IATA: none; ICAO: none

Summary
- Elevation AMSL: 133 ft (41 m)

Runways
Direction	Length		Surface
Direction	ft	m	Surface
	3,000	914	laterite

Katum Camp (also known as Katum Special Forces Camp or Firebase Katum) is a former U.S. Army and Army of the Republic of Vietnam (ARVN) base northeast of Tây Ninh in southern Vietnam.

== History ==
The base was originally established to support Operation Junction City in February 1967 and the first US combat parachute jump of the war took place west of the camp. By 3 March 1967 the 1st Engineer Battalion had completed an airfield at Kà Tum. The base was located 40 km northeast of Tây Ninh, 43 km west of An Lộc and 8 km south of the Cambodian border.

The camp was used by the 1st Brigade, 25th Infantry Division during Operation Yellowstone which ran from December 1967 until February 1968.

In November 1967 the 5th Special Forces Group Detachment A-322 moved to Kà Tum from Camp Suối Đá to monitor infiltration activity from Cambodia.

The base received frequent artillery and mortar fire from the Vietcong and People's Army of Vietnam leading to it being nicknamed Kaboom.

On 1 February 1968 Bell UH-1C Iroquois #66-00686 collided with UH-1H #66-16061 while landing at night at Kà Tum resulting in 2 U.S. killed.

On 25 June 1968 a Lockheed C-130E Hercules serial #62-1861, of the 50th Troop Carrier Squadron, took 0.51 calibre AAA fire on takeoff from Kà Tum which set the port outer engine on fire which spread along port wing, the aircraft crash-landed at Tây Ninh.

On 18 August 1968 the Vietcong 5th Sapper Battalion attacked the base but was beaten back. On the morning of 25 September following a mortar and rocket barrage the Vietcong attacked the base again, but were again defeated at a cost of 14 CIDG and 61 Vietcong killed and 10 Vietcong captured.

On 27 May 1969 C-130A #56-0472 of the 21st Tactical Airlift Squadron was hit by ground fire while landing at Kà Tum and the starboard wing burned off in post-landing fire.

On 23 June 1969 C-130B #61-0965 of the 772d Tactical Airlift Squadron, carrying artillery ammunition, was hit by ground fire on approach to Kà Tum and crashed killing all six crewmembers.

The 1st Brigade, 1st Cavalry Division operated from Kà Tum in April–May 1970. On 24 May 1970 a US medevac helicopter was shot down on approach to Kà Tum, passenger Sergeant first class Louis R. Rocco evacuated the wounded crew, actions for which he was later awarded the Medal of Honor.

The 1st Brigade, 25th Infantry Division returned to Kà Tum in June 1970 to support the Cambodian Incursion.

From 28 September to 2 October 1971 the U.S. Army's 3rd Brigade Combat Team, 1st Cavalry Division and 2nd Squadron, 11th Armored Cavalry Regiment mounted Operation Kà Tum, a security operation to cover the withdrawal of US personnel from the base.

From 1970 to November 1971, B Battery 2/32 field artillery was stationed at Ka Tum (Proud Americans).

== Current use ==
The base has been turned over to farmland and housing.
