= Luigi Palma di Cesnola =

Italian-American diplomat and archaeologist (1832–1904)

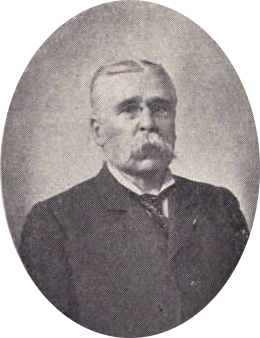
- Cesnola c. 1900
- Born: July 29, 1832; Rivarolo Canavese, Kingdom of Sardinia
- Died: November 20, 1904 (aged 72); New York City, United States
- Burial place: Kensico Cemetery; Valhalla, New York
- Military career
- Allegiance: Kingdom of Sardinia; United Kingdom; United States of America
- Branch: (Kingdom of Sardinia) Sardinian Army; British Army; United States Army; Union Army
- Service years: 1849–1854 (Sardinia); 1854–1856 (UK); 1862–1865 (USA)
- Rank: Colonel (USA)
- Unit: (New York (state)) 4th New York Volunteer Cavalry Regiment
- Commands: 4th New York Volunteer Cavalry Regiment
- Conflicts: First Italian War of Independence; Crimean War; American Civil War
- Awards: Medal of Honor

Signature
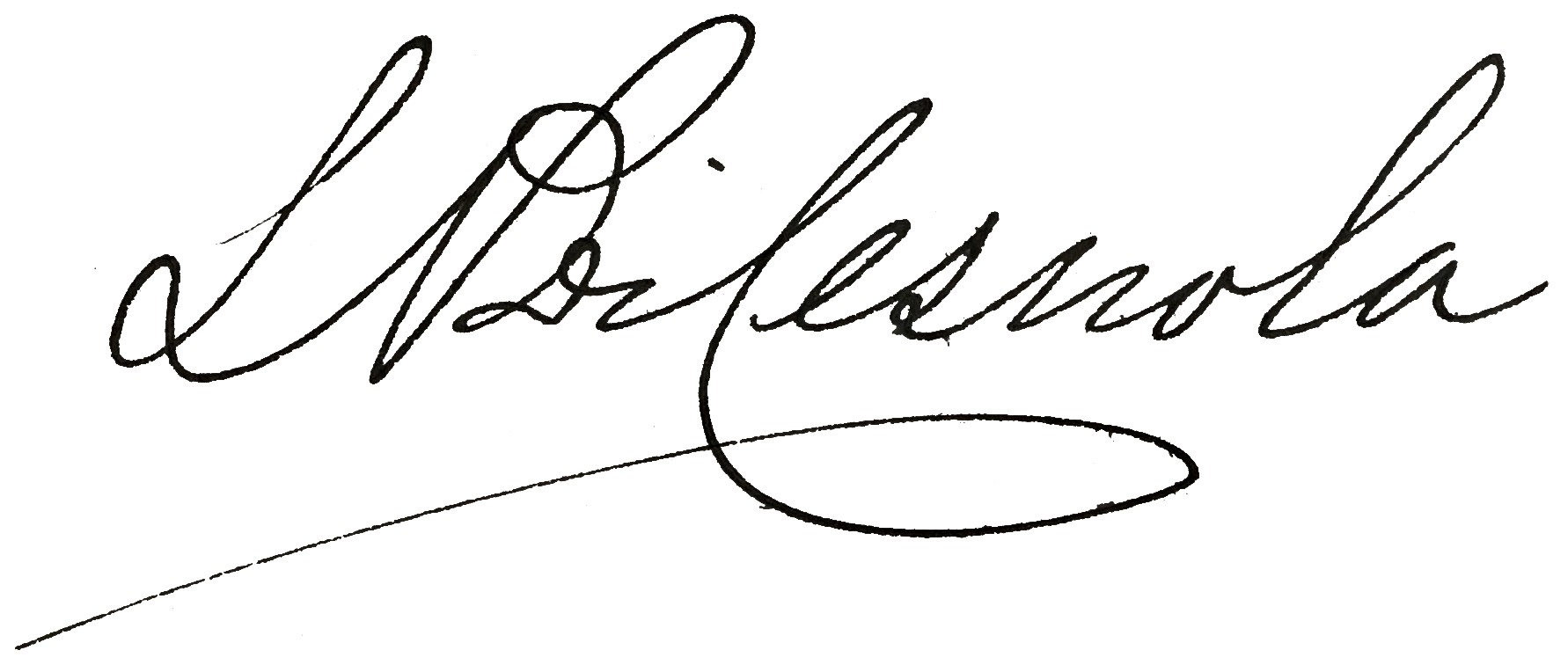

Luigi Palma di Cesnola (July 29, 1832 – November 20, 1904), an Italian-American soldier, diplomat and amateur archaeologist, was born in Rivarolo Canavese, near Turin. He received the Medal of Honor for his actions during the American Civil War. He was United States consul at Larnaca in Cyprus (1865–1877) and first Director of the Metropolitan Museum of Art in New York (1879–1904).

== Biography ==
Luigi Palma di Cesnola was born the second son of a count and military officer at Rivarolo Canavese, Piedmont, in the Kingdom of Sardinia, Italy. His uncle was Italian patriot Alerino Palma, and his brother was Alessandro Palma di Cesnola.

In 1848 Luigi joined the Sardinian army at the age of 15, and served in the First Italian War of Independence. During the Battle of Novara on 23 March 1849, he was decorated for bravery and promoted to the rank of second lieutenant. He graduated from the Royal Military Academy at Cherasco in 1851. In 1854 he was dismissed for unknown reasons, and subsequently served with the British Army in the Crimean War as the aide-de-camp to General Enrico Fardella.

In 1858 he went to New York, where he first taught Italian and French. In February 1861 he married Mary Isabel Reid, the daughter of war hero Commodore Samuel Chester Reid. He then founded a private military school for officers, where in six months he trained over seven hundred students.

=== Civil War service ===
Beginning in 1862, he took part in the American Civil War as colonel of the 4th New York Cavalry Regiment, serving under the name Louis P. di Cesnola. Accused of sending stolen property North, Cesnola was threatened with dishonorable dismissal from the army. However, at the Battle of Aldie (June 1863), Colonel di Cesnola was wounded and taken prisoner. He received a Medal of Honor for his efforts during the battle. He was released from Libby Prison early in 1864 when the Union Agent for Prisoner Exchange offered a personal friend of Jefferson Davis as barter. He served in the Wilderness and Petersburg campaigns (1864–65) as a commander of a cavalry brigade but was not promoted to brigadier general. Although he was nominated for appointment to the brevet grade of brigadier general to rank from March 13, 1865 after the end of the war, the U.S. Senate never confirmed his appointment (contrary to the inscription on his grave stone).

=== Post-war ===
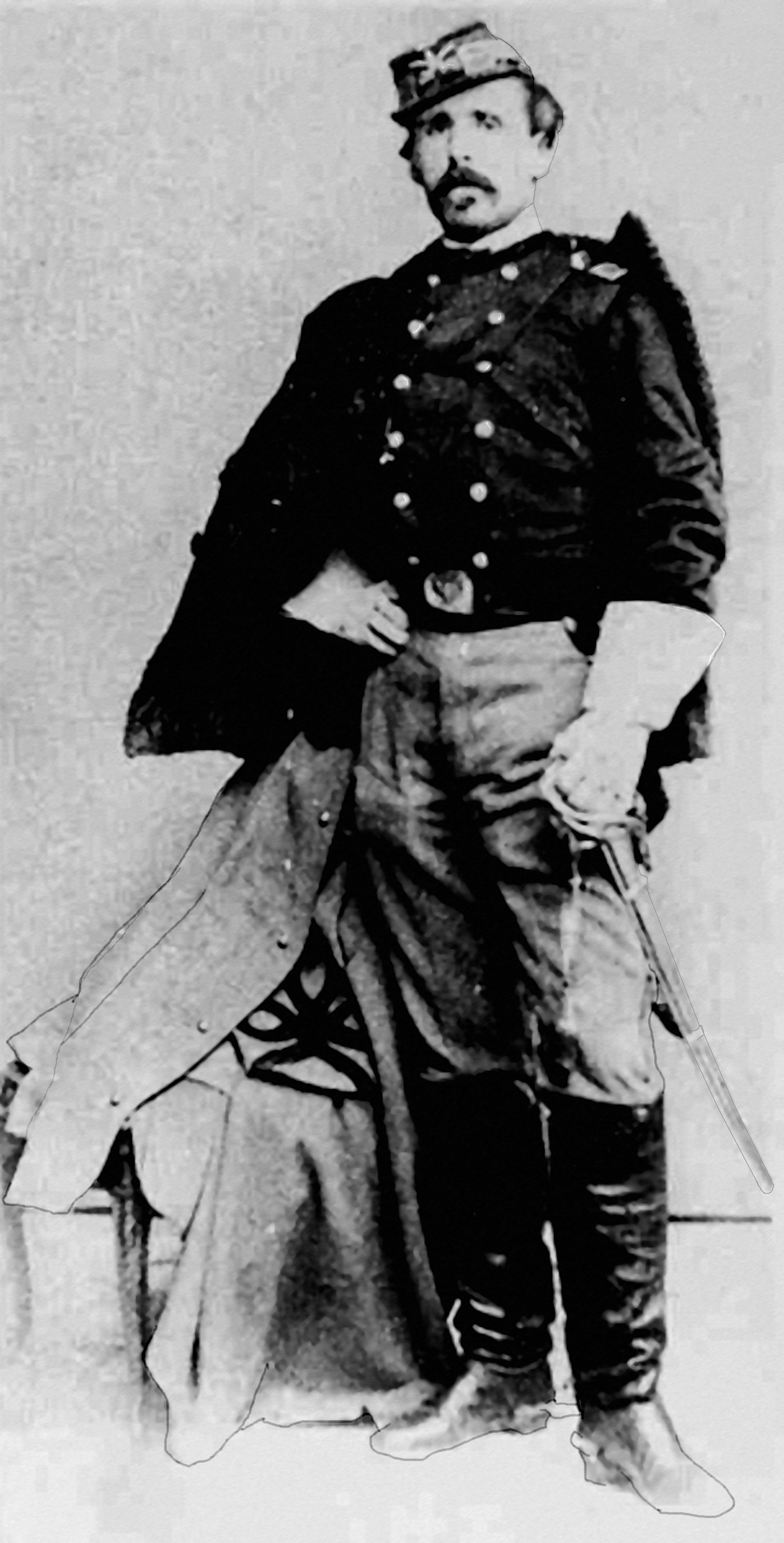
Di Cesnola, Luigi Palma MOH 1863

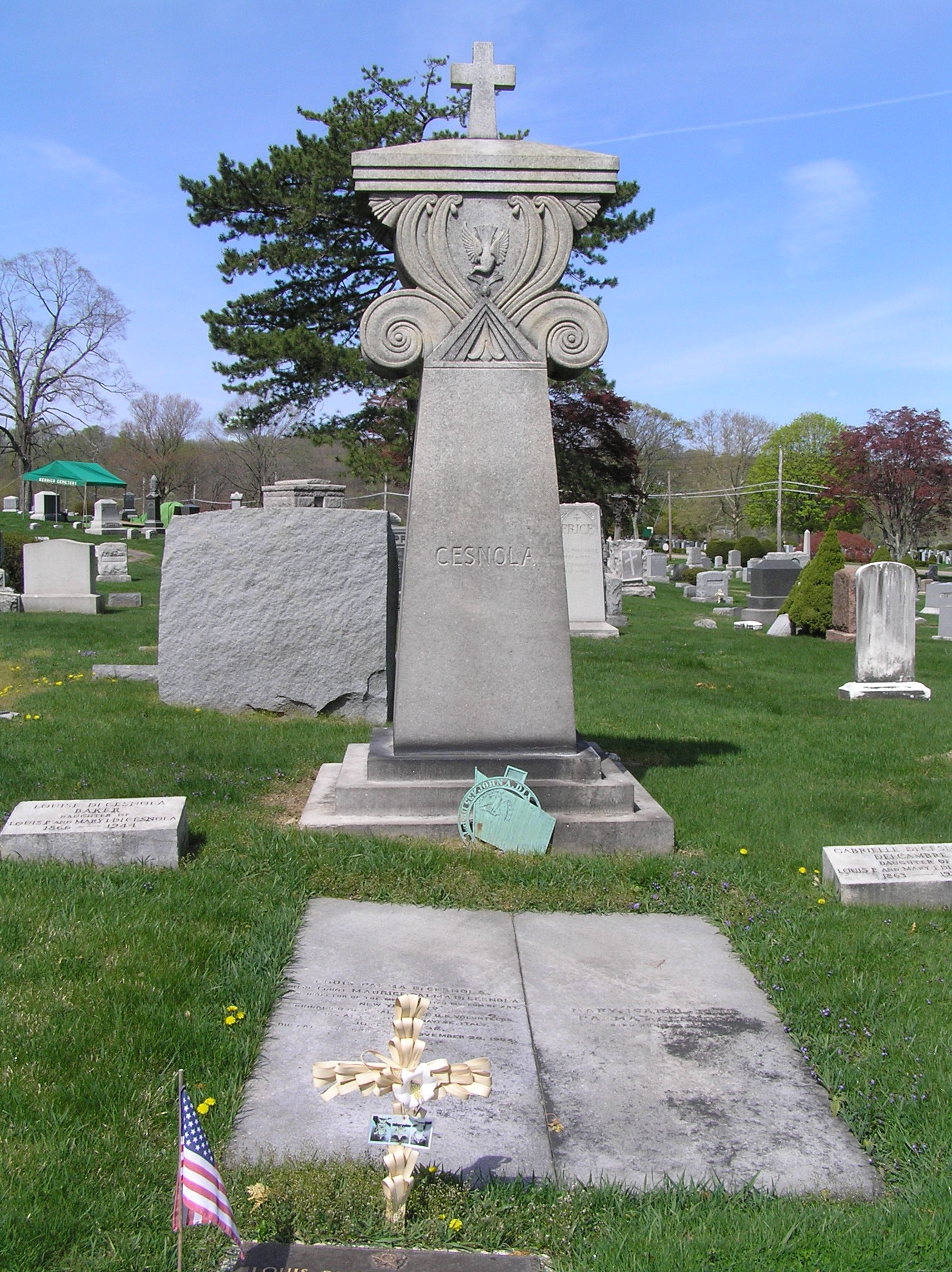
The burial location of Louis Palma Di Cesnola

After the war, he was appointed United States consul at Larnaca in Cyprus (1865–1877). During his stay on Cyprus he carried out excavations (especially around the archaeological site of Kourion), which resulted in the discovery of a large number of antiquities. The Napried, one of the ships commissioned by di Cesnola to transport approximately 35,000 pieces of antiquities that he had collected from Cyprus, was lost at sea carrying about 5,000 pieces in its cargo. The collection was purchased by the newly expanded Metropolitan Museum of Art in New York in 1872, and Cesnola became the first director in 1879, until his death in 1904. Doubt having been thrown by the art critic Clarence Cook, and by Gaston L. Feuardent, in an article in the New York Herald (August 1880), upon the genuineness of his restorations, the matter was referred to a special committee, which pronounced in his favor. In Cyprus however, his actions are still considered tantamount to looting. Researcher Ahmet Gazioğlu, citing excerpts from di Cesnola's own book, wrote that di Cesnola often excavated illegally using blackmail and that he was "a problem to the Turkish authorities, both because of his contempt for the law and his misbehaviour towards the officials and the people".

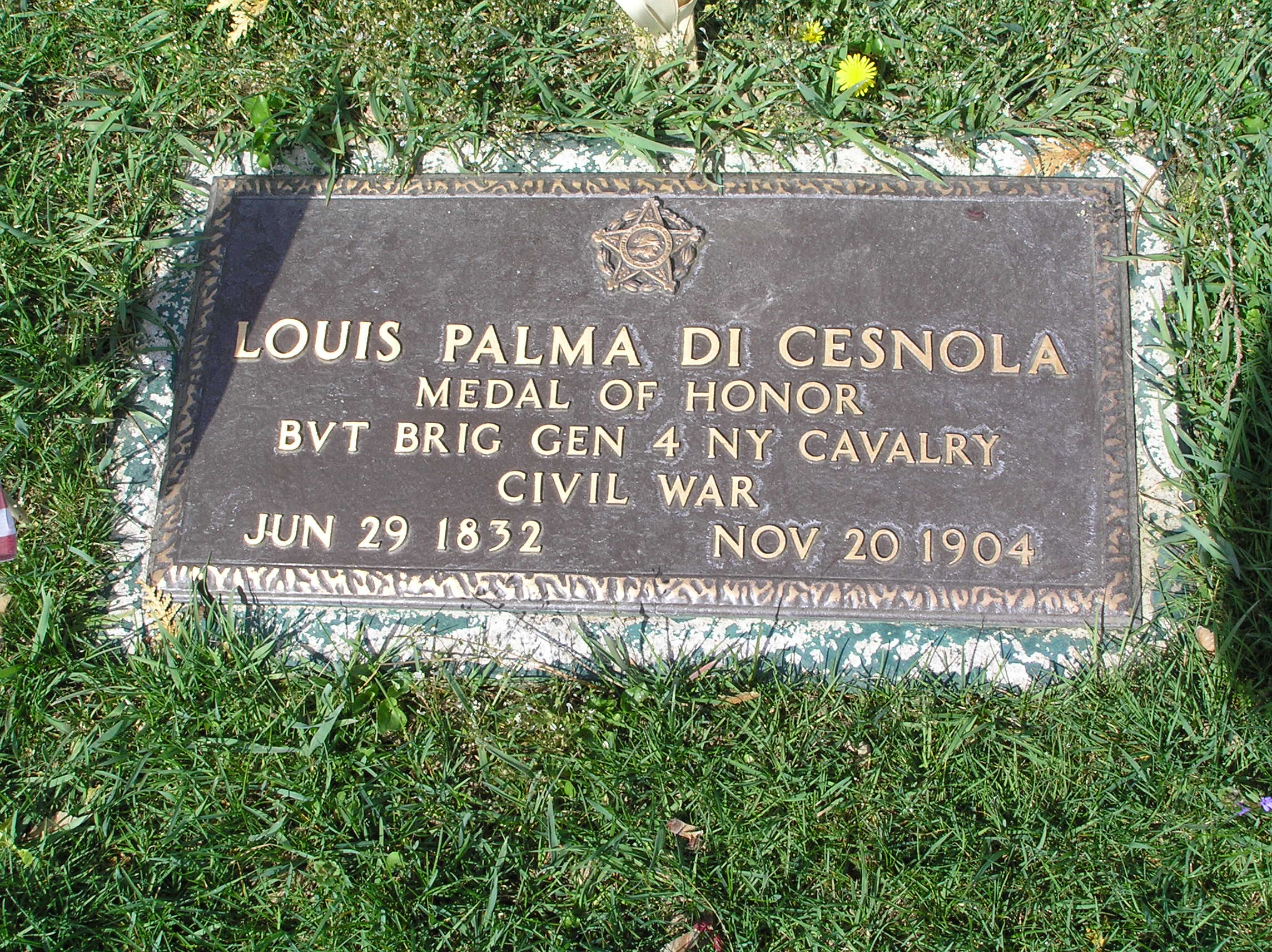
The footstone of Louis Palma Di Cesnola

Cesnola was the author of Cyprus, its ancient Cities, Tombs and Temples (1877), a travel book of considerable service to the practical antiquary; and of a Descriptive Atlas of the Cesnola Collection of Cypriote Antiquities (3 volumes, 1884–1886). He received honorary degrees from Columbia and Princeton universities and a special knightly order from the king of Italy, and was a member of several learned societies in Europe and America. He was a companion of the New York Commandery of the Military Order of the Loyal Legion of the United States.

He died in New York City on November 20, 1904. He was interred at Kensico Cemetery in Valhalla, NY. His funeral, on 23 November 1904 at St. Patrick's Cathedral (Manhattan), was attended by a crowd of more than 2000 dignitaries and mourners.

== Medal of Honor citation ==
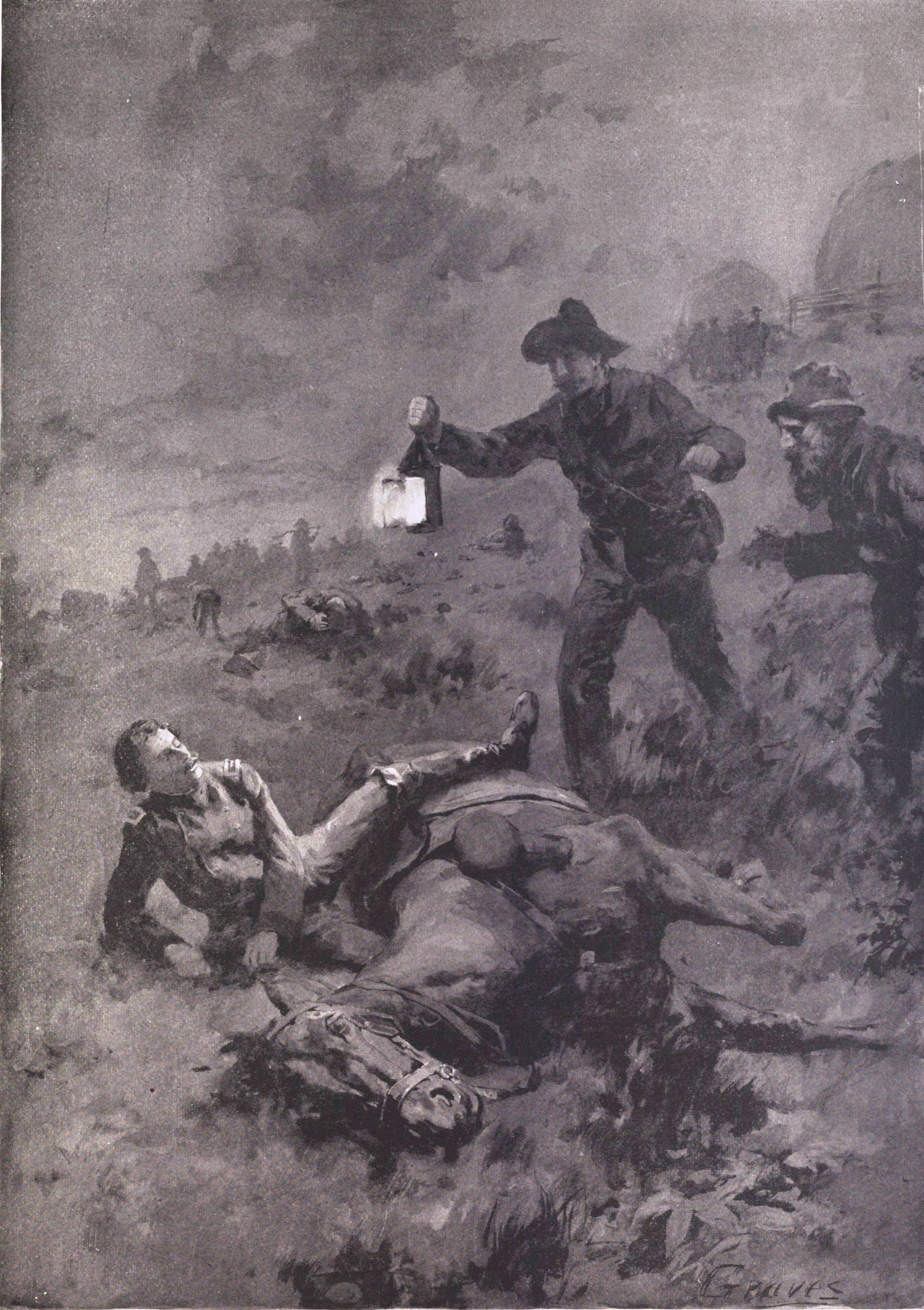
di Cesnola is captured during the Battle of Aldie, from Deeds of Valor

Rank and organization: Colonel, 4th New York Cavalry. Place and date: At Aldie, Va., June 17, 1863. Entered service at: New York, N.Y. Born: June 29, 1832, Rivarolo Canavese, Turin, Piedmont, Italy. Date of issue: December 6, 1897

Was present, in arrest, when, seeing his regiment fall back, he rallied his men, accompanied them, without arms, in a second charge, and in recognition of his gallantry was released from arrest. He continued in the action at the head of his regiment until he was desperately wounded and taken prisoner.

At the start of the battle at Aldie, Cesnola was placed under arrest by his superior officer for protesting the promotion of a less experienced officer to brigadier general. He was stripped of his saber and sidearm. Without Cesnola the Fourth New York Cavalry balked repeatedly when asked to charge a hillside gun battery. The commanding general knew Cesnola was needed to rally the unit. He said, "Colonel, you are a brave man. You are released from arrest. Here is my own sword. Take it and bring it back to me covered in the enemy's blood." When he entered the battle "the regiment arrived on the scene of conflict, and by a gallant charge, turned apparent defeat into a glorious victory for our arms, completely routing the enemy and cutting off nearly 100 men, all of whom were captured." At the close of the battle Cesnola was found in a field lying under his own horse, wounded on the head by a saber and on the arm by a minie ball.

== See also ==
- List of Medal of Honor recipients for the Battle of Gettysburg
- List of Italian American Medal of Honor recipients
- List of American Civil War Medal of Honor recipients: A–F
- Italian Americans in the Civil War
- Cesnola Phoenician inscriptions

== Notes ==
Cultural offices
Preceded by –	Director of the Metropolitan Museum of Art; 1879–1904	Succeeded by Caspar Purdon Clarke
