= Cesnola Phoenician inscriptions =

Inscriptions of ancient Semitic civilization

The Cesnola Phoenician inscriptions are 28 Phoenician inscriptions from Cyprus (primarily Kition) in the Metropolitan Museum of Art's Cesnola Collection. They were discovered by Luigi Palma di Cesnola during his tenure as the United States Consul to Cyprus from 1865 to 1871. They were inscribed on votive bowls, two stelae, and on 18 different vases.

The Cesnola Collection was brought to public attention for the first time in 1870 when Emil Rödiger presented a report to the Prussian Academy of Sciences, and in 1872 Paul Schröder published facsimiles of the texts. The collection was acquired by New York's Metropolitan Museum of Art in 1872. Many were then published in the 1880s in the Corpus Inscriptionum Semiticarum, although CIS inscriptions 24, 26 and 28 and RES 389, 1518 and 1519 are now missing - i.e. they are not in the museum and some were not in the collection when it was studied in 1885. One is in the Museum of Fine Arts, Boston (72.129).

They were first systematically classified by John Myres in 1914, and then again by Javier Teixidor in 1976.

== Inscriptions ==
Details of the inscriptions are below, using Teixidor's numbering.

=== Krater fragments ===
No.	Image	Object	Accession number	Date	Inscription Summary	CIS / RÉS	Myres	Other ref
1		Rim fragments	74.51.2275-77	392-362 BCE	Mentions Milkyaton, king of Citium and Idalium, and a religious dedication.	I 21, 17 ab, 20; RES 1531, 1528	1806-8	Cyprus pls. 9:3, 10:13; Atlas III, pl. 122:5 abc
2		Rim fragment	74.51.2281	392-362 BCE	Mentions Milkyaton, king of Citium and Idalium.	I 18	1812	Cyprus pl. 10:12; Atlas III, pl. 122:9; Hall 2, IX
3		Rim fragment	74.51.2274	392-362 BCE	Partial inscription mentioning "king of Citium and Idalium."	I 19	1805	Cyprus pl. 10:11; Atlas III, pl. 122:4; Hall 2, IV
4		Handle fragment	74.51.2289	5th-4th century BCE	Partial inscription, possibly "cup."	I 30	1820	Atlas III, pl. 123:16; Hall 2, XVI
5		Rim fragment	74.51.2286	5th-4th century BCE	Possible dedication mentioning "statue."	I 29	1817	Cyprus pl. 11:20; Atlas III, pl. 123:14; Hall 2, XIV
6		Rim fragment	74.51.2284	5th-4th century BCE	Possible votive gift dedication.	I 34, RES 1533	1815	Cyprus pl. 11:16; Atlas III, pl. 123:12; Hall 2, XII
7		Rim fragments	74.51.2287-88	5th-4th century BCE	Votive text with regnal year of the monarch.	I 31, 35	1818-19	Cyprus pl. 11:18, 19; Atlas III, pl. 123:15 ab; Hall 2, XV ab
8		Fragment	74.51.2293	5th-4th century BCE	Partial text, possibly a name, "son of ..."	I 36	1824	Cyprus pl. 11:22; Atlas III, pl. 123:20; Hall 2, XX
9		Rim fragment	74.51.2278	5th-4th century BCE	Title of the dedicator, possibly "interpreter of the thrones."	I 22ab	1809	Atlas III, pl. 122:6; Hall 2, VI
10		Bowl fragment	74.51.2285	5th-4th century BCE	Dedication to "his Lord Esmun Melqart."	I 37	1816	Cyprus pl. 11:23; Atlas III, pl. 123:13; Hall 2, XIII
11		Rim fragment	74.51.2280	5th-4th century BCE	Dedication to Esmun and Melqart.	I 23	1811	Cyprus pl. 10:10; Atlas III, pl. 122:8; Hall 2, VIII
12		Rim fragment	74.51.2292	5th-4th century BCE	Dedication to Esmun Melqart.	I 28	1823	Cyprus pl. 11:17; Atlas III, pl. 123:19; Hall 2, XIX
13		Rim and handle fragment	74.51.2279	5th-4th century BCE	Dedication from the son of Abdmelqart to Esmun Melqart.	I 39, RES 1534	1810	Atlas II, pl. 141, 1051; Hall 2, VII
14		Rim fragments	74.51.2272-73	5th-4th century BCE	Dedication to Esmun Melqart.	I 16ab, RES 1530	1803-04	Cyprus pls. 10:14, 9:1; Atlas III, pl. 122:3 ab; Hall 2, III ab
15		Rim and handle fragment	74.51.2282	5th-4th century BCE	Dedication to Esmun Melqart.	I 25ab	1813ab	Cyprus pls. 10:15, 12:30; Atlas III, pl. 122:10; Hall 2, X
16		Rim fragment	74.51.2283	5th-4th century BCE	Dedication to Esmun Melqart.	I 27	1814	Cyprus pl. 11:21; Atlas III, pl. 123:11; Hall 2, XI
17		Rim fragment	74.51.2291	5th-4th century BCE	Possible end of a votive formula.	I 33	1822	Cyprus pl. 9:5; Atlas III, pl. 123:18; Hall 2, XVIII
18		Rim fragment	74.51.2290	5th-4th century BCE	Partial inscription, possibly "q' h t" (aleph and het uncertain).	I 32	1821	Cyprus pl. 9:6; Atlas III, pl. 123:17; Hall 2, XVII

=== Marble blocks ===
No.	Image	Object	Accession number	Date	Inscription Summary	CIS / RÉS	Myres	Other ref
19		Block of white marble	74.51.2271	5th-4th century BCE	Traditional reading with the name Hannibal and a dedication formula.	I 15	1802	Cyprus pl. 9:4; Atlas III, pl. 122:2; Hall 2, II
20		Block of white marble	74.51.2294	4th century BCE	Inscription mentions Pumiyaton, king of Citium and Idalium, and two offerings.	I 14, RES 1529	1801	Cyprus pl. 9:2; Atlas III, pl. 122:1; Hall 1, 25–26; Hall 2, 7

=== Vases ===
No.	Image	Object	Accession number	Date	Inscription Summary	CIS / RÉS	Myres	Other ref
21		Amphora of coarse white ware	74.51.2298a, b	Late 7th century BCE	The name "Baalay," indicating ownership or dedication.	RES 1521	1826	Cyprus pl. 9:7; Atlas III, pl. 123:26; Hall 2, XXVI; Peckham, 16–17
22		Amphora of coarse ware	74.51.2299	4th century BCE	The name "Baalazor," a well-known theophorous name, likely the owner's name.	RES 1526	1828	Hall 2, XXVII; Peckham, 17
23		Amphora of red earthenware	74.51.2300	Early 7th century BCE	Name "Baalpilles," "Yaton," and possibly title "inspector" or "inspected."	RES 1520	1827	Cyprus pl. 10:8; Atlas II, 1049; Hall 2, XXV; Peckham, 16–17
24		Alabastron	74.51.2295a	4th century BCE	Inscription reads "kly" with an unknown symbol, possibly indicating ownership or contents.	RES 1523	1825	Cyprus pl. 12:25; Atlas II, 1048; Hall 2, XXII; Peckham, 17
25		Jug of red-slip ware	74.51.1401	8th century BCE	The name "'nts," unknown in both Phoenician and Greek.	RES 1524	479	Cyprus pl. 12:26; Atlas II, pl. 141:1052; Hall 2, XXIII; Peckham, 105, 115
26		Steatite vase	74.51.5057a	9th-10th century BCE	Three undeciphered signs, possibly "hhh," considered archaic.	RES 1525	1540	Cyprus pl. 12:27; Atlas II, pl. 141:1050; Hall 2, XXIV; Peckham, 17
27		Painted white ware vase	74.51.1001	7th century BCE	Inscription with four letters, "d/r g m n," unknown in Phoenician.	RES 1522	775	Cyprus p. 68, pl. 10:9; Atlas II, pl. 141:1047; Hall 2, XXI; Peckham, 17

=== Other ===
No.	Image	Object	Accession number	Date	Inscription Summary	Bibliography
28		Sarcophagus from Amathus	74.51.2452	450-400 BCE	Single letter "shin" on the foot end of the lid.	Myres, 233–234

== Bibliography ==
- Cannavò, Anna; Schmid, Stephan G. (2020-12-01). "From Paul Schröder's archives on Cyprus, IV. The inscriptions from the Lang and Cesnola collections". Cahiers du Centre d'Études Chypriotes (50): 175–193. doi:10.4000/cchyp.504. ISSN 0761-8271.
- Teixidor, Javier (1976). "The Phoenician Inscriptions of the Cesnola Collection". Metropolitan Museum Journal. 11: 55–70. doi:10.2307/1512684. ISSN 0077-8958. JSTOR 1512684.
- Myres, John L. 1914. Handbook of the Cesnola Collection of Antiquities from Cyprus. no. 1801, New York: The Metropolitan Museum of Art.
- Corpus Inscriptionum Semiticarum: and
- Cesnola, Palma di (1878). Cyprus: Its Ancient Cities, Tombs, and Temples: A Narrative of Researches and Excavations During Ten Years' Residence in that Island : With Maps and Illustrations. Harper & Brothers.
