= George Ferrari =

United States Army Medal of Honor recipient (c. 1845–1895?)

- Born: c. 1845; New York City, US
- Died: May 4, 1895 ?
- Burial place: Seattle, Washington, US
- Military career
- Allegiance: United States of America
- Branch: United States Army
- Service years: c. 1869–1870
- Rank: Corporal
- Unit: 8th U.S. Cavalry
- Conflicts: Indian Wars; Apache Wars
- Awards: Medal of Honor

Corporal George Ferrari (c. 1845 – 1895?) was an American soldier in the U.S. Army who served with the 8th U.S. Cavalry during the Apache Wars. He was one of three men who received the Medal of Honor for gallantry against the Apache Indians at Red Creek in the Arizona Territory on September 23, 1869. He was the first and only Italian-American to receive the award during the thirty-year period of the Indian Wars.

== Biography ==
George Ferrari was born in New York City, New York in about 1845. He later joined the U.S. Army in Cleveland, Ohio and was assigned to Company D of the 8th U.S. Cavalry. Ferrari was sent to the Arizona Territory where he took part in the Apache Wars in the late-1860s. On September 23, 1869, he and two other cavalry troopers, Private John Walker and Sergeant Charles Harris, were cited for "gallantry in action" against the Apache at Red Creek and received the Medal of Honor. Although he was the first and only Italian-American ever to receive the MOH during the Indian Wars, little of his life is known prior to and after leaving the military.

== Medal of Honor citation ==
Rank and organization: Corporal, Company D, 8th U.S. Cavalry. Place and date: At Red Creek, Ariz., September 23, 1869. Entered service at: Montgomery County, Ohio. Birth: New York, N.Y. Date of issue: November 23, 1869.

Citation

Gallantry in action.

== See also ==
- List of Medal of Honor recipients for the Indian Wars
