= Alessandro Palma di Cesnola =

Italian archaeologist

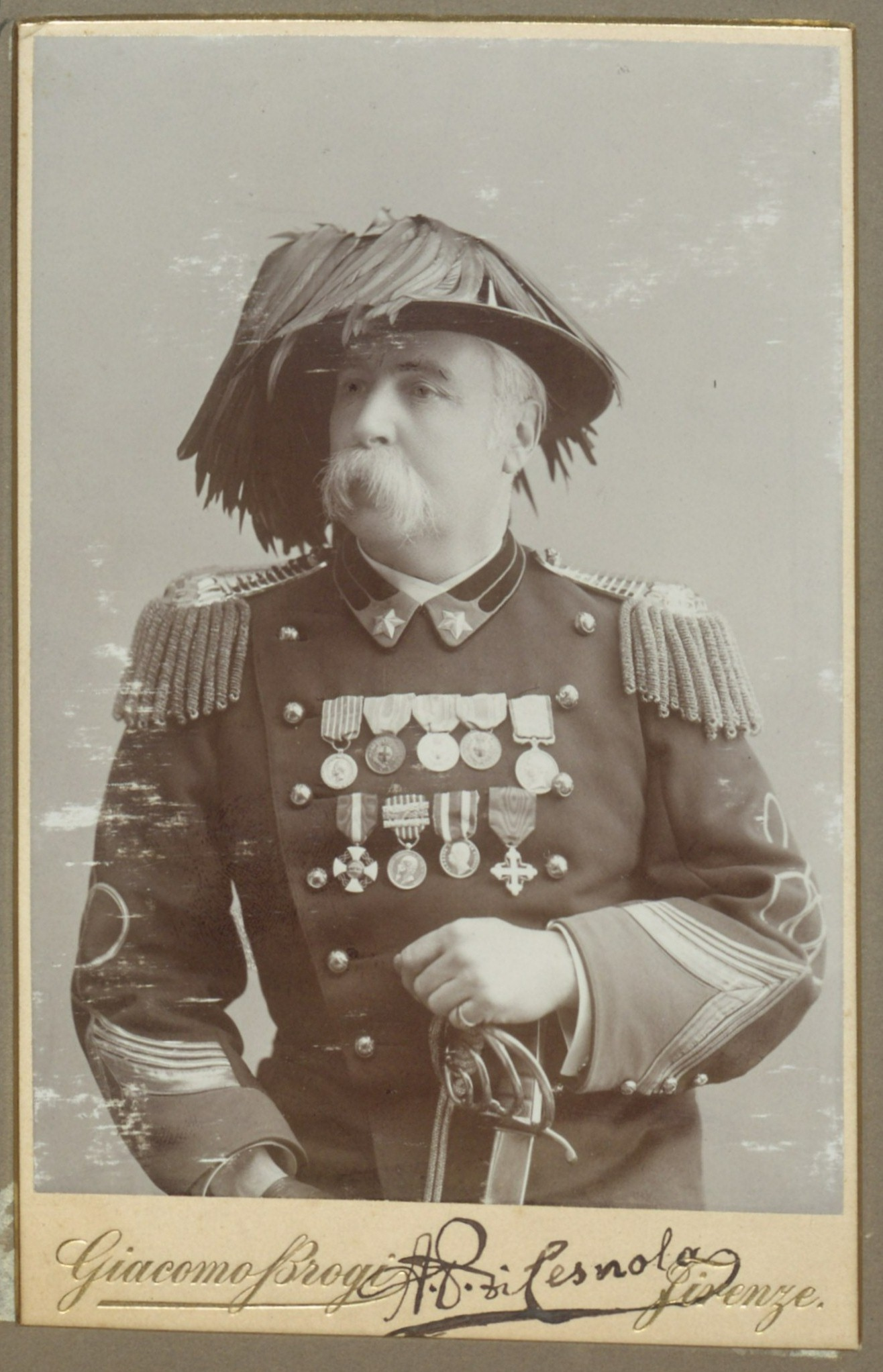
Alessandro Palma di Cesnola

Alessandro Palma di Cesnola (1839–1914) was an Italian-American diplomat who conducted excavations in Cyprus. He worked at Paphos, where he was U.S. vice-consul, and Salamis on behalf of the British government. The results of these are described in Salaminia (1882). In 1878, Cesnola was arrested for conducting an illegal investigation in Cyprus. Alessandro was the brother of the better known excavator Luigi Palma Di Cesnola.

== Publications ==
- Cesnola, A. P. di. (1881). Cyprus Antiquities: excavated by Major Alexander Palma di Cesnola, member of the Biblical Archaeological Society, 1876-1879. London: Printed and bound by W. Holmes & Son.
- Cesnola, A. P. (1884). Salaminia (Cyprus): The History, Treasures, & Antiquities of Salamis in the Island of Cyprus. Whiting and Company.
- Cesnola, A. P. di. (1887). Salamina (Cipro): storia, tesori e antichità di Salamina nell’isola di Cipro. Ermanno Loescher.
