= John Walker (Medal of Honor) =

American Indian Wars soldier and Medal of Honor recipient

- Born: c. 1845
- Military career
- Allegiance: United States of America
- Branch: United States Army
- Rank: Private
- Unit: 8th U.S. Cavalry
- Conflicts: Apache Wars
- Awards: Medal of Honor

John Walker a/k/a Joseph Frazier, was an American soldier. He was a private with Company D, 8th U.S. Cavalry of the United States Army, who received the Medal of Honor for "gallantry in action" in combat with Apache Indians during the Apache Wars, at Red Creek, Arizona in the Arizona Territory (a few miles north of the present-day Lake Pleasant Regional Park) on September 23, 1869. Eighteen Indians were reportedly killed, with more wounded. The Medal of Honor was issued on November 23, 1869. However, John Walker had an alias of "Joseph Frazier." He reportedly deserted twice, with the final desertion in 1874. John Walker was reportedly born in about 1845 in Leon, Landes Forest, Aquitaine, France, while "Joseph Frazier" was reportedly born in Italy. Sergeant Charles Harris and Corporal George Ferrari also received the Medal of Honor for bravery in that battle.
