= Cornedo Vicentino =

- Comune
- Comune di Cornedo Vicentino

- Location within Italy Location within Veneto
- Coordinates: 45°37′N 11°21′E
- Country: Italy
- Region: Veneto
- Province: Vicenza (VI)
- Frazioni: Cereda, Montepulgo, Muzzolon, Spagnago

Area
  - Total: 23 km^{2} (8.9 sq mi)
- Elevation: 200 m (660 ft)

Population (28 February 2007)
  - Total: 11,718
  - Density: 510/km^{2} (1,300/sq mi)
- Demonym: Cornedesi
- Time zone: UTC+1 (CET)
  - Summer (DST): UTC+2 (CEST)
- Postal code: 36073
- Dialing code: 0445
- ISTAT code: 024034
- Patron saint: San Giovanni Battista
- Website: Official website

Cornedo Vicentino is a town and comune in the province of Vicenza, Veneto, Italy. It is north of SP246.

== Twin towns ==
Cornedo Vicentino is twinned with:

- Sobradinho, Rio Grande do Sul, Brazil, since 2002
