= International Festival of Ancient Greek Drama, Cyprus =

The International Festival of Ancient Greek Drama is a theatre festival that takes place every summer in Cyprus. It is organised by the Cyprus Centre of International Theatre Institute, the Deputy Ministry of Culture and the Deputy Ministry of Tourism of the Republic of Cyprus. It began in 1997 and it's an annual event which attracts professional theatre companies from various parts of the world. It has hosted companies from Greece, Britain, United States, Germany, Russia, Romania, Sweden, Croatia, Bulgaria, Italy, Austria, Korea, Slovenia, China, Cyprus, and many more. This wide international participation in the Festival helps to bring out the universality of ancient Greek drama and underline its living presence in today's world. The Festival is held in July and early August when Cyprus attracts visitors from all over the world. Thus with its performances, it brings ancient Greek drama into contact with a multicultural audience. The performances take place at various venues around Cyprus including the ancient amphitheatre at Kourion, the Paphos Ancient Odeon and the Makarios III Amphitheatre in Nicosia.

16th International Festival of Ancient Greek Drama 2012 participants

play	author	company	base	country
Electra and Orestes, the Trial	based on Aeschylus, Sophocles and Euripides	Cyprus Theatre Organisation	Nicosia	Cyprus
Agamemnon's Children	based on Sophocles and Euripides	Hessisches Staatstheater	Wiesbaden	Germany
Assemblywomen	Aristophanes	Neos Kosmos Theatre	Athens	Greece
The Bacchae	Euripides	Mitos Theatre Group	Limassol	Cyprus
Electra	Sophocles	Morphes Ekfrasis Theatre	Athens	Greece
The Frogs	Aristophanes	Magdalena Zira Theatre	Nicosia	Cyprus
The Eumenides	Aeschylus	Ruth Kanner Theatre Group	Tel Aviv	Israel
Antigone	based on Tommaso Traetta and Sophocles	Skull of Yorick Productions	London	United Kingdom

15th International Festival of Ancient Greek Drama 2011 participants

play	author	company	base	country
Cyclops	Euripides	Amphiktio Theatre	Nicosia	Cyprus
The Trackers	Sophocles	Anagnosis Cultural Society	Athens	Greece
Oedipus the King	Sophocles	Zhejiang Beijing Opera	Beijing	China
Prometheus Bound	Aeschylus	Compagnie José Besprosvany	Brussels	Belgium
Medea	Euripides	Buzz Productions Theater	Nicosia	Cyprus
Prometheus Bound	Aeschylus	Attis Theatre	Athens	Greece
Antigone	Sophocles	Theatre Lab Company	London	United Kingdom
Dionysia	excerpts from various plays	Northern Greece State Theatre	Thessaloniki	Greece

14th International Festival of Ancient Greek Drama 2010 participants

play	author	company	base	country
Alcestis	Euripides	Free Space Theatre for Youth	Oryol	Russia
Oresteia	Aeschylus	Municipal and Regional Theatre	Patras	Greece
Lysistrata	Aristophanes	Cyprus Theatre Organisation	Nicosia	Cyprus
Wealth - Triumph of Poverty	Aristophanes	Theatro Technis Karolos Koun	Athens	Greece
Agamemnon	Aeschylus	SNG Drama	Ljubljana	Slovenia
Thesmophoriazusae	Aristophanes	People's Art Theatre	Wuhan	China
Lysistrata	Aristophanes	National Theatre of Greece	Athens	Greece

13th International Festival of Ancient Greek Drama 2009 participants

play	author	company	base	country
Antigone	after Sophocles	State Ballet	Mecklenburg	Germany
La Passione delle Troiane	after Euripides	Cantieri Teatrali Koreja	Lecce	Italy
The Libation Bearers	Aeschylus	Thessalian Theatre	Mecklenburg	Greece
Medea	Euripides	Teatrul National 'Marin Sorescu'	Craiova	Romania
Thebaid	after Sophocles and Euripides	Anerada Theatre	Nicosia	Cyprus
The Clouds	Aristophanes	Cyprus Theatre Organisation	Nicosia	Cyprus
Electra	Euripides	Dance Theatre Roes	Athens	Greece
Alcestis	Euripides	National Theatre of Greece	Athens	Greece
Iphigenia in Aulis	Euripides	Herzliya Ensamble	Herzliya	Israel

12th International Festival of Ancient Greek Drama 2008 participants

play	author	company	base	country
Electra	Euripides	Radu Stanca National Theatre	Sibiu	Romania
Plutus	Aristophanes	Cyprus Theatre Organisation	Nicosia	Cyprus
The Birds	Aristophanes	Theatro Technis Karolos Koun	Athens	Greece
Medea	Euripides	Teatro Instabile	Aosta	Italy
The Persians	Aeschylus	Astràgali Teatro	Lecce	Italy
Medea	Euripides	Semeio Theatre	Athens	Greece
Ajax	Sophocles	Attis Theatre	Athens	Greece
Antigone	Sophocles	Habima Theatre	Tel Aviv	Israel
