= Kourion =

Ancient city-kingdom of Cyprus

- Koύριov
- Curium
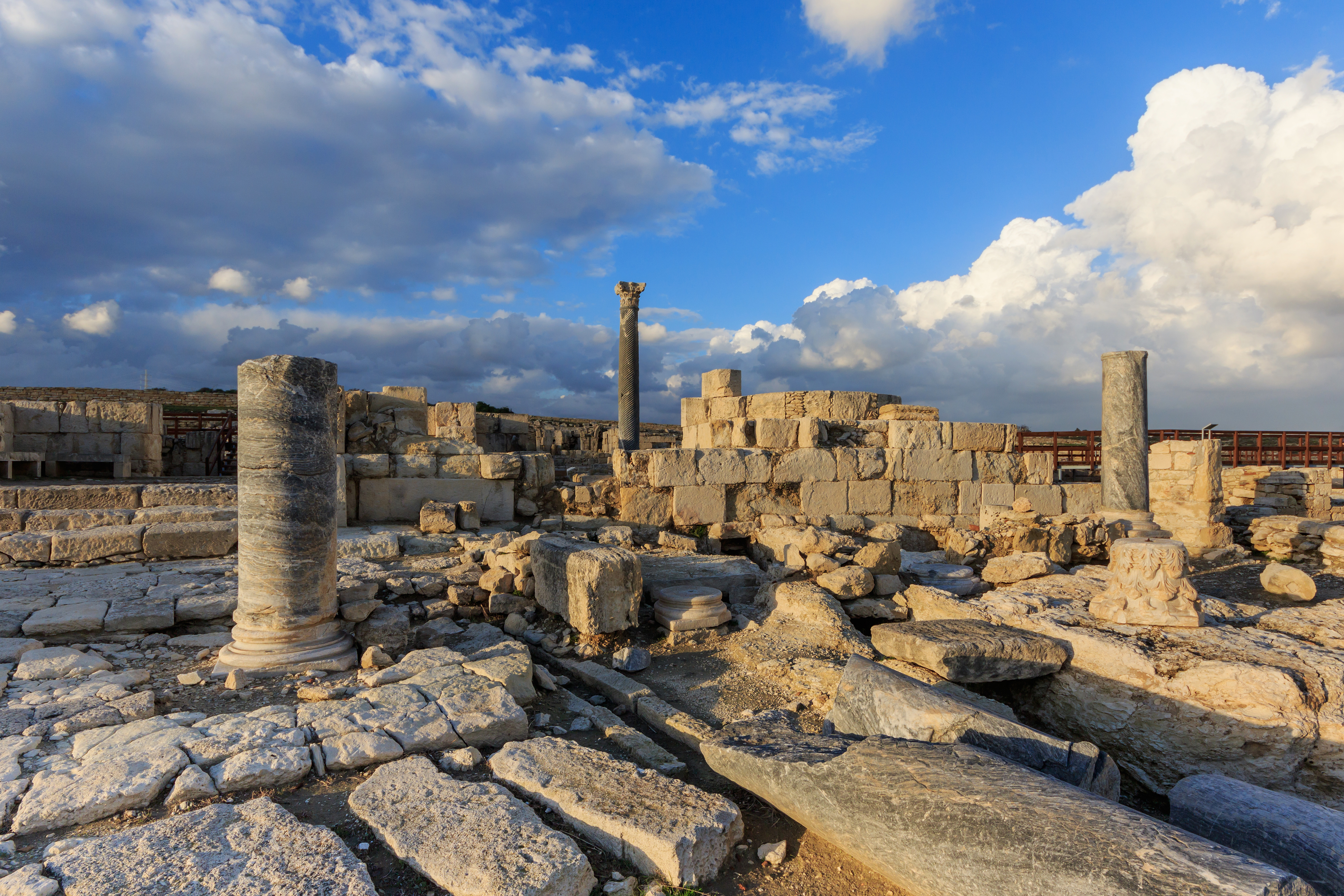
- Kourion Agora

- Location within Cyprus
- 34.6642°N 32.8877°E
- Type: Settlement
- Location: Episkopi, Limassol District, Cyprus; Episkopi Cantonment, British Overseas Territory Of Akrotiri and Dhekelia

Site notes
- Excavation dates: 1875, 1895, 1934–1938, 1947–1954, 1956–1959, 1964–present
- Archaeologists: Luigi Palma di Cesnola, H.B. Walters, G. McFadden, B.H. Hill, J. Daniel, A.H.S. Megaw, M.C. Loulloupis, David Soren, Thomas W. Davis
- Management: Cyprus Department of Antiquities

Kourion (Ancient Greek: Koύριov; Latin: Curium) was an important ancient Greek city-state on the southwestern coast of the island of Cyprus. In the twelfth century BCE, after the collapse of the Mycenaean palaces, Greek settlers from Argos arrived on this site.

In the fourth century, Kourion suffered from five heavy earthquakes, but the city was mostly rebuilt. The acropolis of Kourion, located 1.3 km (0.81 mi) southwest of Episkopi and 13 km (8.1 mi) west of Limassol, is located atop a limestone promontory nearly 100 metres (330 ft) high along the coast of Episkopi Bay.

The Kourion archaeological area lies within the British Overseas Territory of Akrotiri and Dhekelia and is managed by the Cyprus Department of Antiquity.

== History of Kourion ==
=== Early history of the area ===
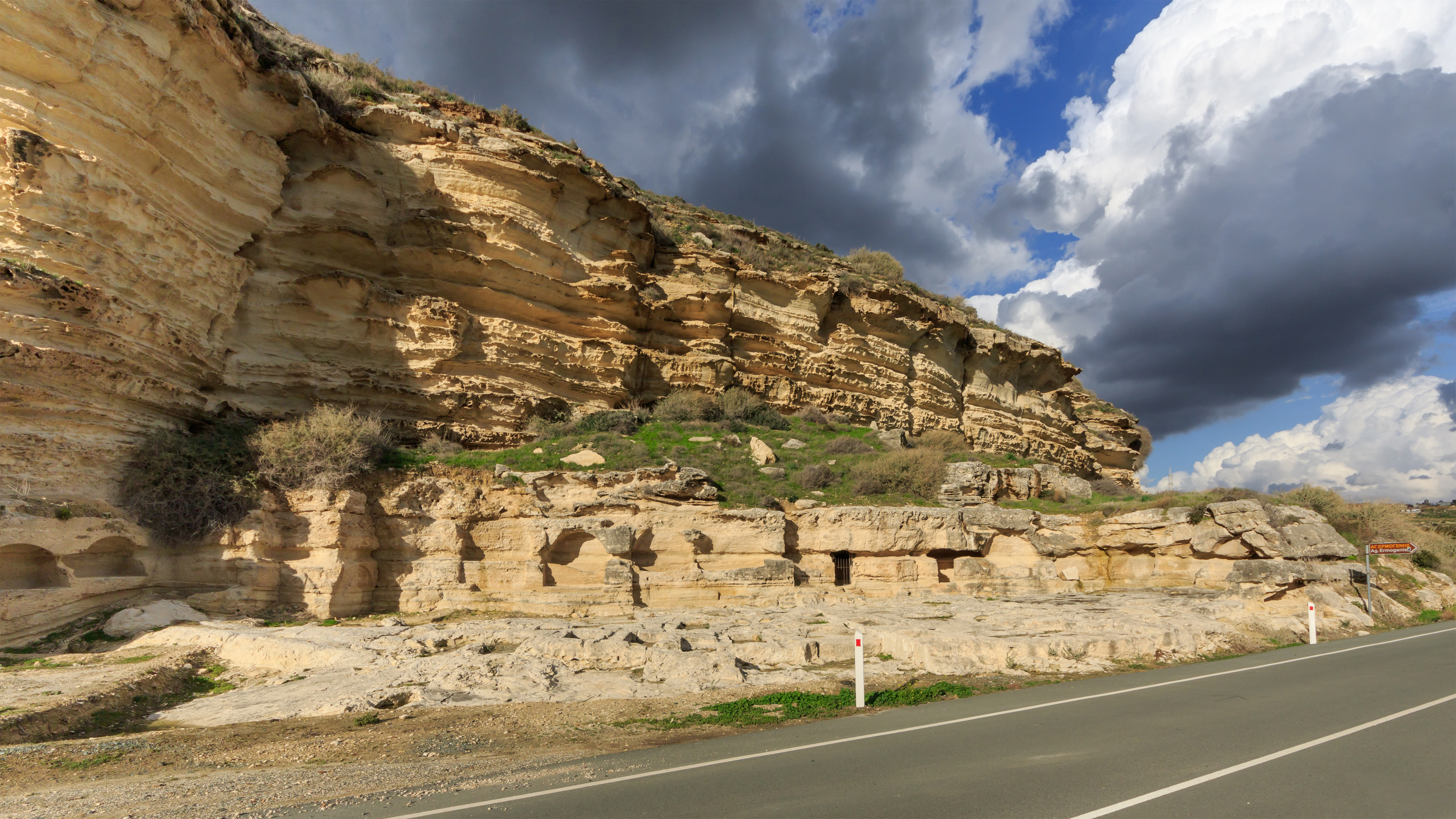
Edge of Kourion plateau with ancient tombs

The earliest identified occupation within the Kouris River valley is at the hilltop settlement of Sotira-Teppes, located 9 km (5.6 mi) northwest of Kourion. This settlement dates to the Ceramic Neolithic period (c. 5500–4000 BCE). Another hilltop settlement from the same era has been excavated at Kandou-Kouphovounos on the east bank of the Kouris River. In the Chalcolithic period (3800–2300 BCE), settlement shifted to the site of Erimi-Pamboules near the village of Erimi. Erimi-Pamboules was occupied from the conclusion of the Ceramic Neolithic through the Chalcolithic period (3400–2800 BCE).

Occupation in the Early Cypriot (EC) period (c. 2300–1900 BCE) is uninterrupted from the preceding Chalcolithic period, with occupation continuing along the Kouris River Valley and the drainages to the west. Sotira-Kaminoudhia, located to the northwest of Sotira-Teppes, on the lower slope of the hill, was settled. It dates from the Late Chalcolithic to EC I (c. 2400 – 2175 BCE). In the ECIII-LC (Late Cypriot), IA (c. 2400–1550 BCE) a settlement was established 0.8 km (0.50 mi) east of Episkopi at Episkopi-Phaneromeni. The Middle Cypriot (1900–1600 BCE) is a transitional period in the Kouris River Valley. The settlements established during the MC flourished into urban centres in the Late Cypriot II-III, especially Episkopi-Bamboula.

In the Late Cypriot I-III (1600–1050 BCE), the settlements of the Middle Cypriot period developed into a complex urban centre within the Kouris Valley, which provided a corridor in the trade of Troodos copper, controlled through Alassa and Episkopi-Bamboula. In the MCIII-LC IA, a settlement was occupied at Episkopi-Phaneromeni. Episkopi-Bamboula, located on a low hill 0.4 km (0.25 mi) west of the Kouris and east of Episkopi, was an influential urban centre from the LC IA-LCIII. The town flourished in the 13th century BCE before being abandoned c. 1050 BCE.

=== Kingdom of Kourion ===
Ancient kingdoms of Cyprus

The Kingdom of Kourion, a Southern Cypriot kingdom, was established during the Cypro-Geometric period (CG) (1050–750 BCE) though the site of the settlement remains unidentified. Without Cypro-Geometric settlement remains, the primary evidence for this period is from burials at the Kaloriziki necropolis, below the bluffs of Kourion. At Kaloriziki, the earliest tombs date to the 11th century BCE (Late-Cypriot IIIB) with most burials dating to the Cypriot-Geometric II (mid-11th to mid-10th centuries BCE). These tombs, particularly McFadden's Tomb 40, provide a picture of an increasingly prosperous community in contact with mainland Greece.

Although Cyprus came under Assyrian rule, in the Cypro-Archaic period (750–475 BCE) the Kingdom of Kourion was among the most influential of Cyprus. Damasos is recorded (as Damasu of Kuri) as king of Kourion on the prism (672 BCE) of Esarhaddon from Nineveh.

Between 569 and c. 546 BCE, Cyprus was under Egyptian administration.

In 546 BCE, Cyrus I of Persia extended Persian authority over the kingdoms of Cyprus, including the Kingdom of Kourion. During the Ionian Revolt (499–493 BCE), Stasanor, king of Kourion, aligned himself with Onesilos, king of Salamis, the leader of a Cypriot alliance against the Persians. In 497, Stasanor betrayed Onesilos in battle against the Persian general Artybius, resulting in a Persian victory over the Cypriot poleis and the consolidation of Persian control of Cyprus.

In the Classical Period (475–333 BCE), the earliest occupation of the acropolis was established, though the primary site of settlement is unknown. King Pasikrates (Greek: Πασικράτης) of Kourion is recorded as having aided Alexander the Great in the siege of Tyre in 332 BCE. Pasikrates ruled as a vassal of Alexander, but was deposed in the struggles for succession amongst the diadochi. In 294 BCE, the Ptolemies consolidated control of Cyprus, and therefore Kourion came under Ptolemaic governance.

=== Roman history ===
In 58 BCE, the Roman plebeian council passed the Lex Clodia de Cyprus, fully annexing Cyprus to the province of Cilicia. Between 47 and 31 BCE, Cyprus returned briefly to Ptolemaic rule under Marc Antony and Cleopatra VII, reverting to Roman rule after the defeat of Antony. In 22 BCE, Cyprus was separated from the province of Cilicia, being established as an independent senatorial province under a proconsul.

Under the Romans, Kourion possessed a civic government functioning under the oversight of the provincial proconsul. Inscriptions from Kourion attest elected offices that included: Archon of the City, the council, clerk of the council and people, the clerk of the market, the various priesthoods including priests and priestesses of Apollo Hylates, and priesthoods of Rome. It is thought that Kourion flourished and quality of life increased due to good trade with the rest of the Roman Empire.

In the first to third centuries, epigraphic evidence attests a thriving elite at Kourion, as indicated by a floruit of honorific decrees (Mitford No.84, p. 153) and dedications, particularly in honour of the emperor, civic officials and provincial proconsuls. In the first and second centuries, Mitford suggests excessive expenses by the council of the city and peoples of Kourion on such honours, resulting in the sanctions and oversight of expenditures by the proconsul (Mitford 107), particularly during the Trajanic restorations of the Sanctuary of Apollo Hylates.

Local participation in the imperial cult is demonstrated not only by the presence of a high priesthood of Rome, but also the presence of a cult of Apollo Caesar, a veiled worship of Trajan as a deity alongside Apollo Hylates. Epigraphic honors of the imperial family are particularly notable during the Severan dynasty in the late third and second centuries CE.

As one of the most prominent cities in Cyprus, the city is mentioned by several ancient authors including: Ptolemy (v. 14. § 2), Stephanus of Byzantium, Hierocles and Pliny the Elder.

During the Diocletianic Persecution, Philoneides, the Bishop of Kourion, was martyred. In 341 CE, the Bishop Zeno was instrumental in asserting the independence of the Cypriot church at the Council of Ephesus. From 365 to 370, Kourion was hit by five strong earthquakes, as attested by the archaeological remains throughout the site, presumably suffering near-complete destruction. In the late fourth and early fifth centuries, Kourion was reconstructed, though portions of the acropolis remained abandoned. The reconstruction included the ecclesiastical precinct on the western side of the acropolis. In 648–649, Arab raids resulted in the destruction of the acropolis, after which the centre of occupation was relocated to Episkopi, 2 km (1.2 mi) to the northeast. Episkopi was named as the seat of the bishop (Episcopus).

== History of excavations ==
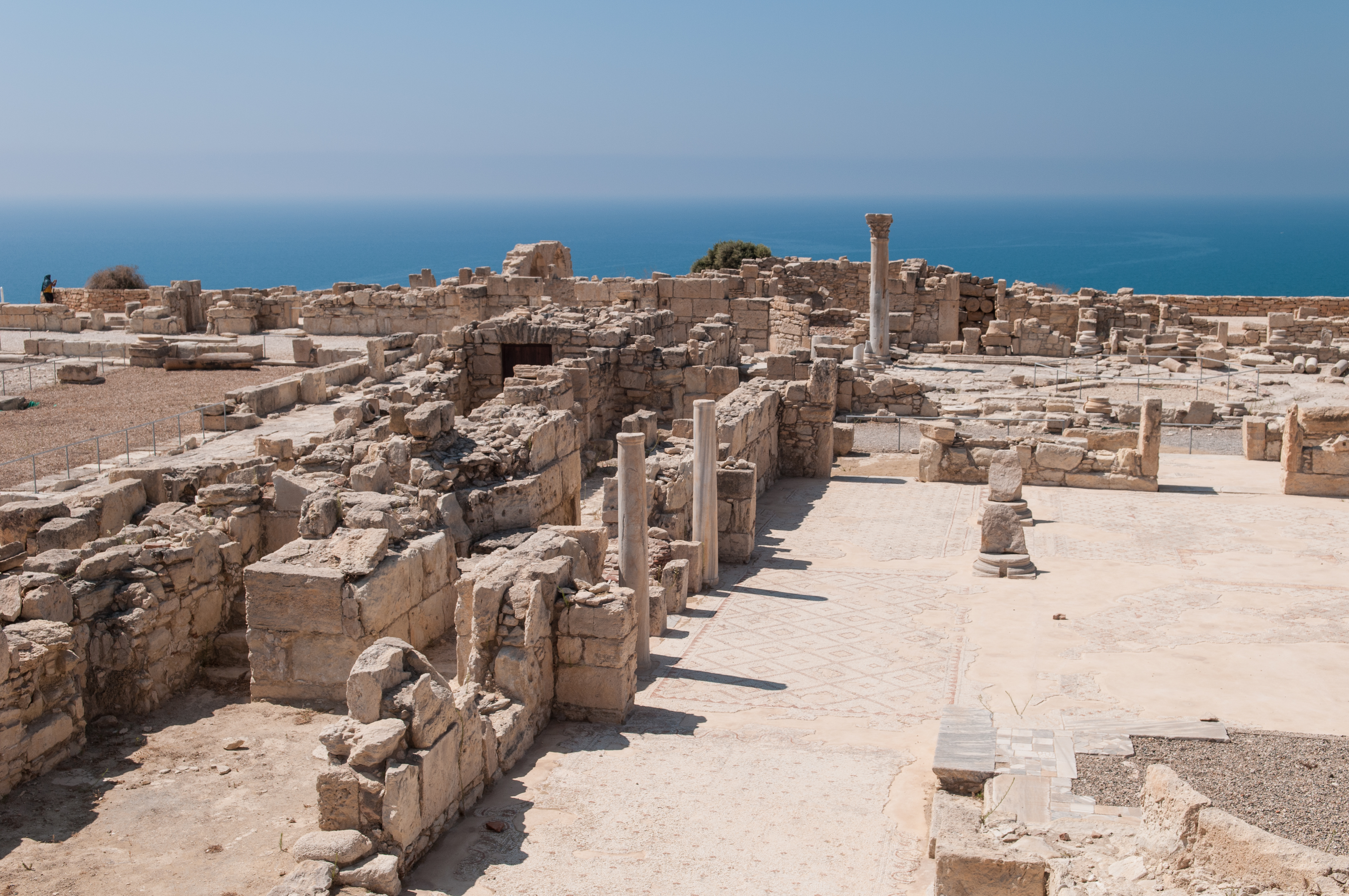
Kourion archaeological site

The site of Kourion was identified in the 1820s by Carlo Vidua. In 1839 and 1849, respectively, Lorenzo Pease and Ludwig Ross identified the Sanctuary of Apollo Hylates to the west of the acropolis. In 1874–1875, Luigi Palma di Cesnola, the American and Russian consul to the Ottoman government of Cyprus, extensively dug at the cemetery of Ayios Ermoyenis and the Sanctuary of Apollo Hylates. His only objective was to recover objects of value, most of which he later sold to the Metropolitan Museum of Art. In 1882 George Gordon Hake excavated about 70 tombs at the base of the acropolis on behalf of the South Kensington Museum. Between 1882 and 1887 several unauthorized private excavations were conducted prior to their illegalization by British High Commissioner, Henry Ernest Gascoyne Bulwer in 1887.

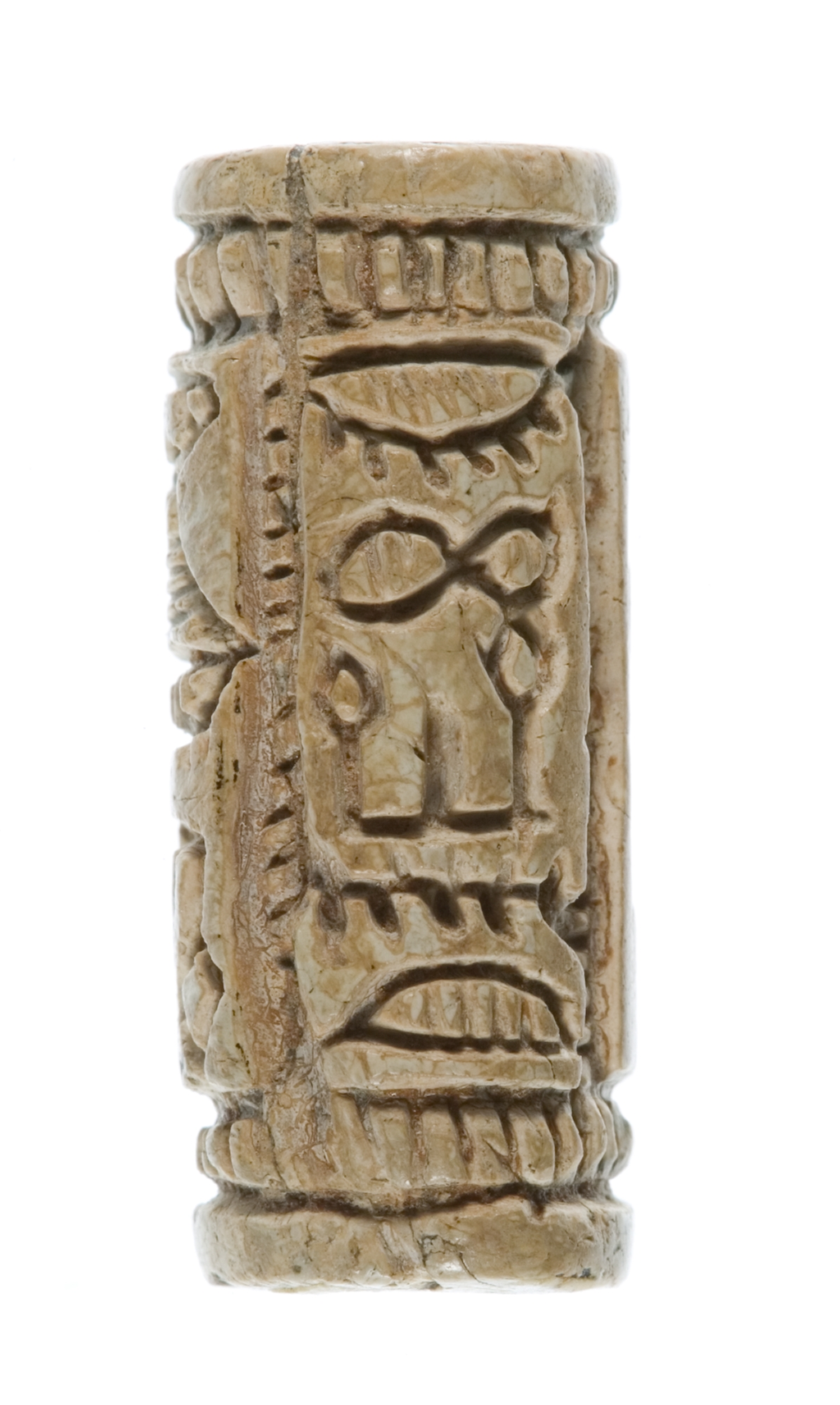
Cylinder seal with falcon headed figure found at Kourion - c. 1648–1540 BCE - Hyksos period

In 1895, the British Museum, led by H.B. Walters, conducted the first quasi-systematic excavations at Kourion as part of the Turner Bequest Excavations.

G. McFadden, B.H. Hill and J. Daniel conducted systematic excavations at Kourion for the University Museum at the University of Pennsylvania in five seasons between 1934 and 1938 and in eight seasons between 1947 and 1954, mainly on the acropolis. They also worked in the cemeteries, including in the Kaloriziki field where they excavated twelve LC III-Iron Age tombs. and in the Late Cypriote II and III areas of Bamboula. Finds included 4 pots and 7 sherds bearing Cypro-Minoan script signs and the Kourion Sceptre (in Tomb 40). Following the death of McFadden in 1953, the project and its publication stalled. The excavations of the Early Christian Basilica on the acropolis were continued by Peter Megaw, Director of Antiquities for the Government of Cyprus, from 1956 to 1959.

M.C. Loulloupis of the Cyprus Department of Antiquities excavated at the House of Gladiators and the Apsed Building between 1964 and 1974. A. Christodoulou (1971–1974), and Demos Christou (1975–1998) also worked at Kourion. Megaw returned to work on the site, on behalf of Dumbarton Oaks Centre for Byzantine Studies, from 1974 to 1979 at the Early Christian Basilica.

Between 1978 and 1984, D. Soren conducted excavations at the Sanctuary of Apollo Hylates, and on the acropolis between 1984 and 1987. D. Parks directed excavations within the Amathus Gate Cemetery between 1995 and 2000. Since 2012, the Kourion Urban Space Project, under director Thomas W. Davis of the Lanier Center for Archaeology at Lipscomb University in Nashville, TN, has excavated on the acropolis.

== Archaeological remains ==
The majority of the archaeological remains within the Kourion Archaeological Area date to the Roman and Late Roman/Early Byzantine periods. The acropolis and all archaeological remains within the area are managed and administered by the Cyprus Department of Antiquities.

=== Sanctuary of Apollo Hylates ===
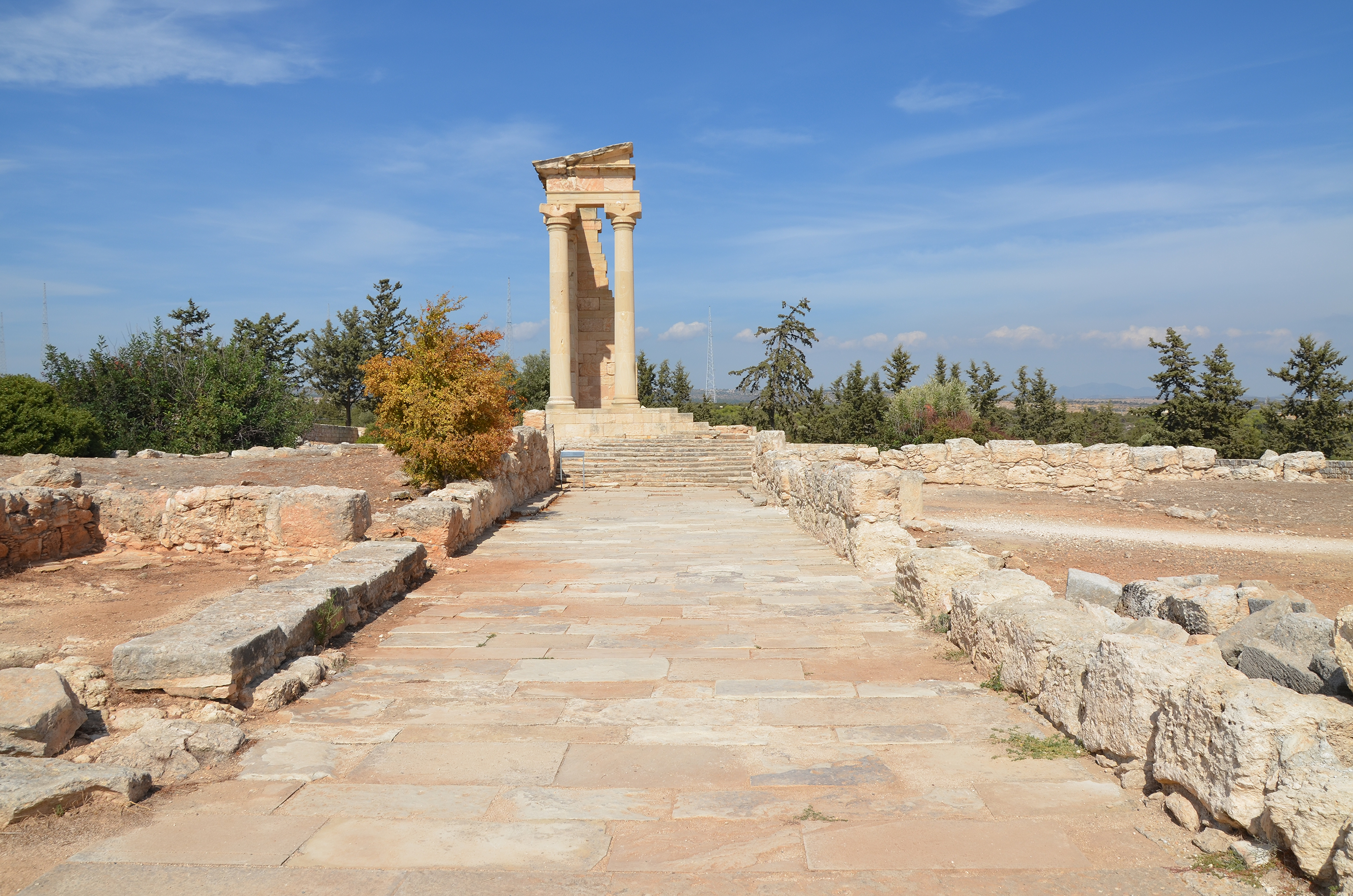
The Sanctuary and Temple of Apollo Hylates

The Sanctuary of Apollo Hylates (Ἀπόλλων Ὑλάτης), 1.7 km (1.1 mi) west of the acropolis and 0.65 km (0.40 mi) in from the coastline, was a Pan-Cyprian sanctuary, third in importance only to the sanctuaries of Zeus Salaminos at Salamis and that of Paphian Aphrodite. The earliest archaeological evidence for the sanctuary are from votive deposits of the late eighth century BCE located in the southern court and at the archaic altar. These votive offerings are dedicated to "the god", apparently unassociated with Apollo until the mid-third century BCE. North of the priests residence and south of temple are the remains of an archaic altar, the earliest structure at the sanctuary dating to the late-eighth or early seventh-century CE.

A structure of the late-fourth century BCE, located east of the later sacred way, and south of the altar served as the residence of the priests of Apollo and the temple treasury. This building was subsequently renovated in the first, third and fourth centuries CE.

The present form of the sanctuary dates to the first century CE and to the restoration under Trajan in the early second century following the earthquake of 76/77 CE. Under Augustan patronage at the end of the first century BCE or early first century CE, the sacred street was laid out, with the palaestra, temple, structure north of the Paphian gate and the circular monument were constructed. The Augustan temple is 13.5 m (44 ft) long and 8.35 m (27.4 ft) wide with a tetrastyle pronaos and cella.

Under Trajan and the Proconsul Quintus Laberius Justus Cocceius Lepidus, the sanctuary underwent restoration and expansion. The southern portico, southern buildings, which likely functioned as dormitories for devotees and the bathhouse were built under this restoration. The temple was subsequently abandoned after a period of decline in the late fourth century CE, after it sustained significant damage in an earthquake.

=== Late Cypro-Classical and Hellenistic remains ===
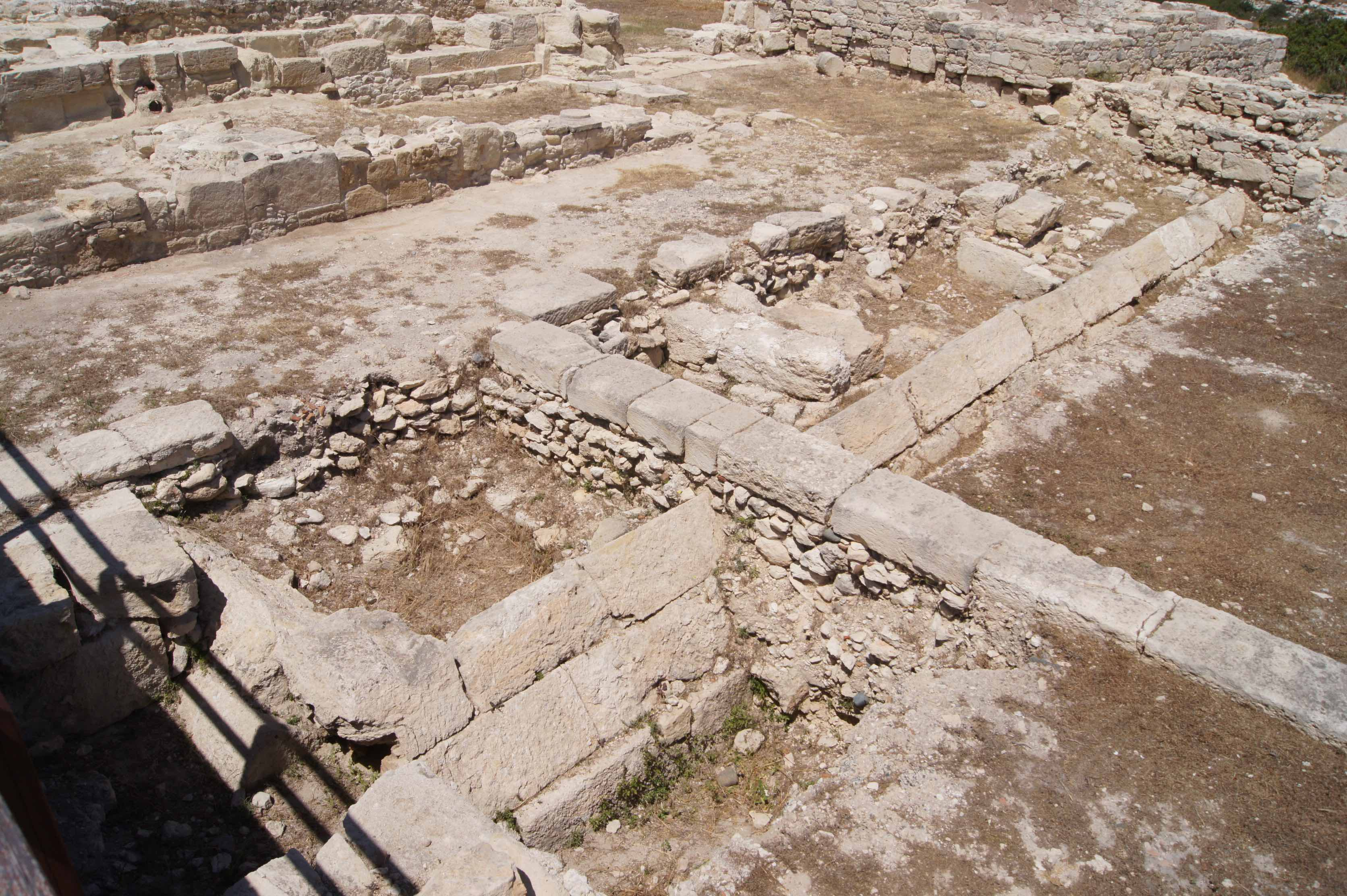
Pyramidal structure beneath baths

The earliest structural remains excavated on the acropolis were uncovered at the northwestern end of the excavations directed by D. Christou in the civic centre. These Late Cypro-Classical (350–325 BCE) remains consist of an ashlar pyramidal structure, perhaps a fortified glacis. Further fortifications dating to the Cypro-Classical have been uncovered along the northern extent of the acropolis area.

The remains of a Hellenistic public structure, approximately 30 m (98 ft) in length are 30 m (98 ft) southeast of the nymphaeum. This structure was used from c. 325 to 50 BCE. Additional Hellenistic remains were uncovered in 1948/1949 by the University of Pennsylvania Museum Expedition immediately east of the Complex of Eustolios in the form of black and white pebble mosaic.

=== Theatre ===
The theatre of Kourion was excavated by the University Museum Expedition of the University of Pennsylvania between 1935 and 1950. The theatre was initially constructed on a smaller scale in the late-second century BCE on the northern slope of the defile ascending from the Amathus Gate. This arrangement thus utilized the slope of the hill to partially support the weight of the seating in the cavea. This architectural arrangement is typical of Hellenistic theatres throughout the Eastern Mediterranean with a circular orchestra and a cavea exceeding 180 degrees.

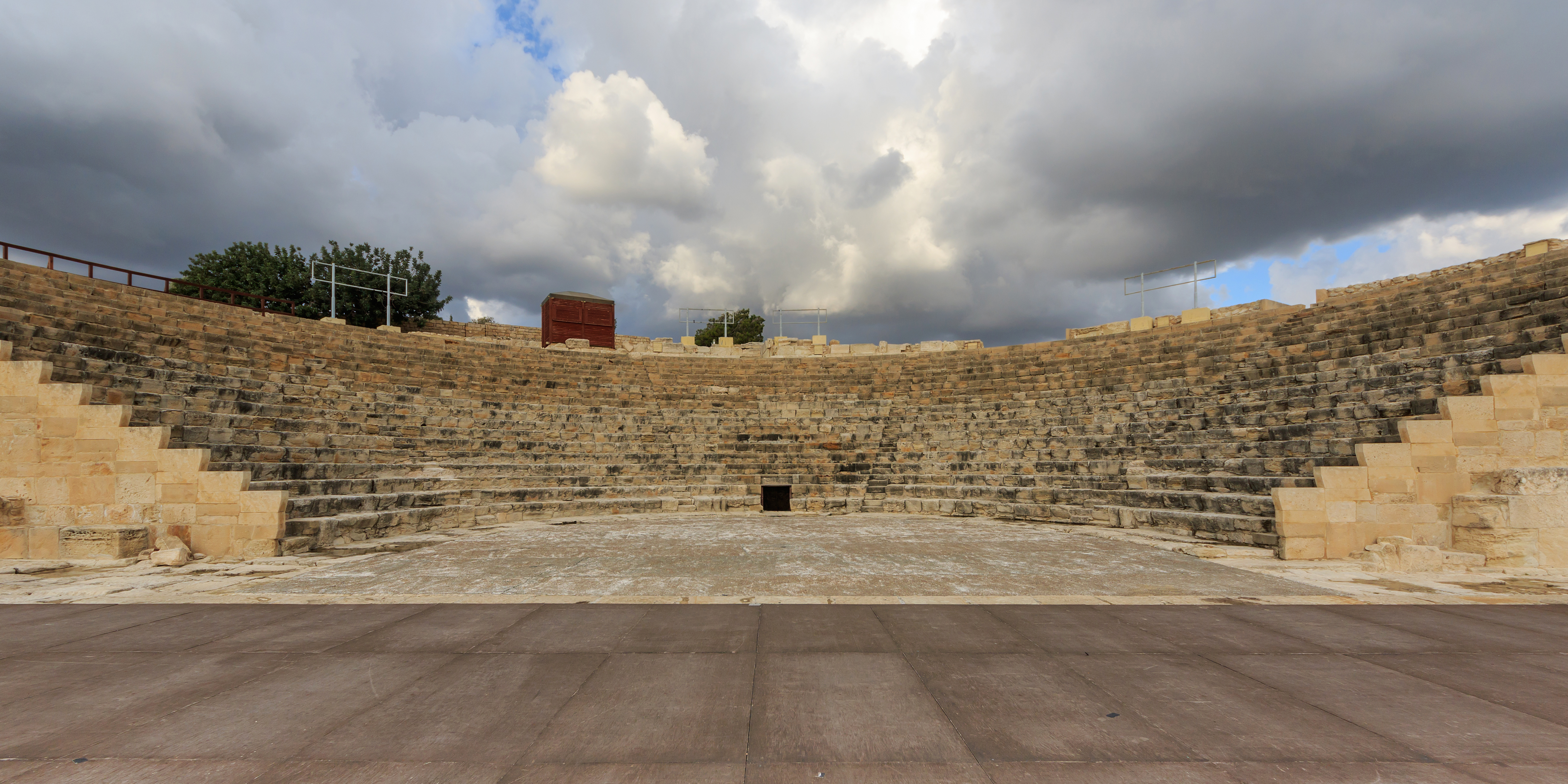
Kourion's Greco-Roman theatre

The theatre was repaired in the late-first century BCE, likely following the earthquake of 15 BCE. The theatre's scene building was seemingly reconstructed in 64/65 CE by Quintus Iulius Cordus, the proconsul, and it was likely at this time the ends of the cavea were removed, reducing it to a Roman plan of 180 degrees. The orchestra was likewise shortened to a semi-circular form. The theatre received an extensive renovation and enlargement under Trajan between ca. 98–111 CE, bringing the theatre to its present size and seating arrangement. The scene building (scaenae frons), now preserved only in its foundations, was rebuilt, bringing it to the height of the cavea. This structure would have originally obscured the view of the Mediterranean to the south.

Between 214 and 217 CE, the theatre was modified to accommodate gladiatorial games and venationes but it was restored to its original form as a theatre after 250 CE. The theatre was abandoned in the later-fourth century CE, likely the result of successive seismic events, the earthquake of 365/70 perhaps resulting in its abandonment. The enlarged cavea of the Roman phases could have accommodated an audience of as many as 3,500. The present remains of the theatre have been restored extensively. The theatre is one of the venues for the International Festival of Ancient Greek Drama.

=== Amathus gate cemetery ===
Located along the base of the cliffs on the southeast and northeast of the acropolis, the Amathus gate cemetery is located north of the road entering the archaeological site, and as such it is the first series of monuments seen by visitors prior to their entrance into the site.

In Antiquity, the ascent to the Amathus gate was along a board ramp ascending gradually from the southeast. The cemetery was situated on two tiers along the lower and upper cliffs east of the Amathus gate, the lower tier being obscured by the modern roadway embankment.

From the third century BCE until the first century CE, the cemetery of Ayios Ermoyenis, consisting primarily of rock-cut chamber tombs with single or multiple chambers and multiple interments, functioned as the primary cemetery of Roman Kourion. Between the first and third centuries, a row of chamber tombs was cut into the upper and lower faces of the eastern cliffs. These chamber tombs were heavily damaged by quarrying in the late fourth to sixth centuries CE, though numerous arcosolia from these chamber tombs remain in the cliff face. Between the late fourth and sixth centuries, burials in this cemetery consist of cist burials cut into the quarried rock shelf.

=== Aqueducts ===
Though the acropolis is very arid today, the city clearly had a good water supply in Roman times as evidenced at least by the nymphaeum and large public and private baths, and also by the substantial amount of piping and water features throughout the site.

Joseph S. Last identified two aqueducts that transported water to the city from two perennial springs: one near Sotira (the smaller source) 11 km distant and Souni (the larger source) at 20 km distant. The western aqueduct from Sotira was made of an estimated 30,000 terra-cotta pipes 0.20 m in diameter and 0.20–0.50 m long. A trunk line of this aqueducts supplied water to the Sanctuary of Apollo. The eastern aqueduct from Souni consisted of an estimated 60,000 pipes with a 0.30 m diameter and 0.30 m length. Last concluded that the eastern aqueduct was a later addition to supplement the western aqueduct.

Prior to the construction of these aqueducts, sometime in the first century CE, the acropolis would have been largely dependent on rain water stored in cisterns due to the absence of natural water sources on the site.

=== House of the Gladiators ===
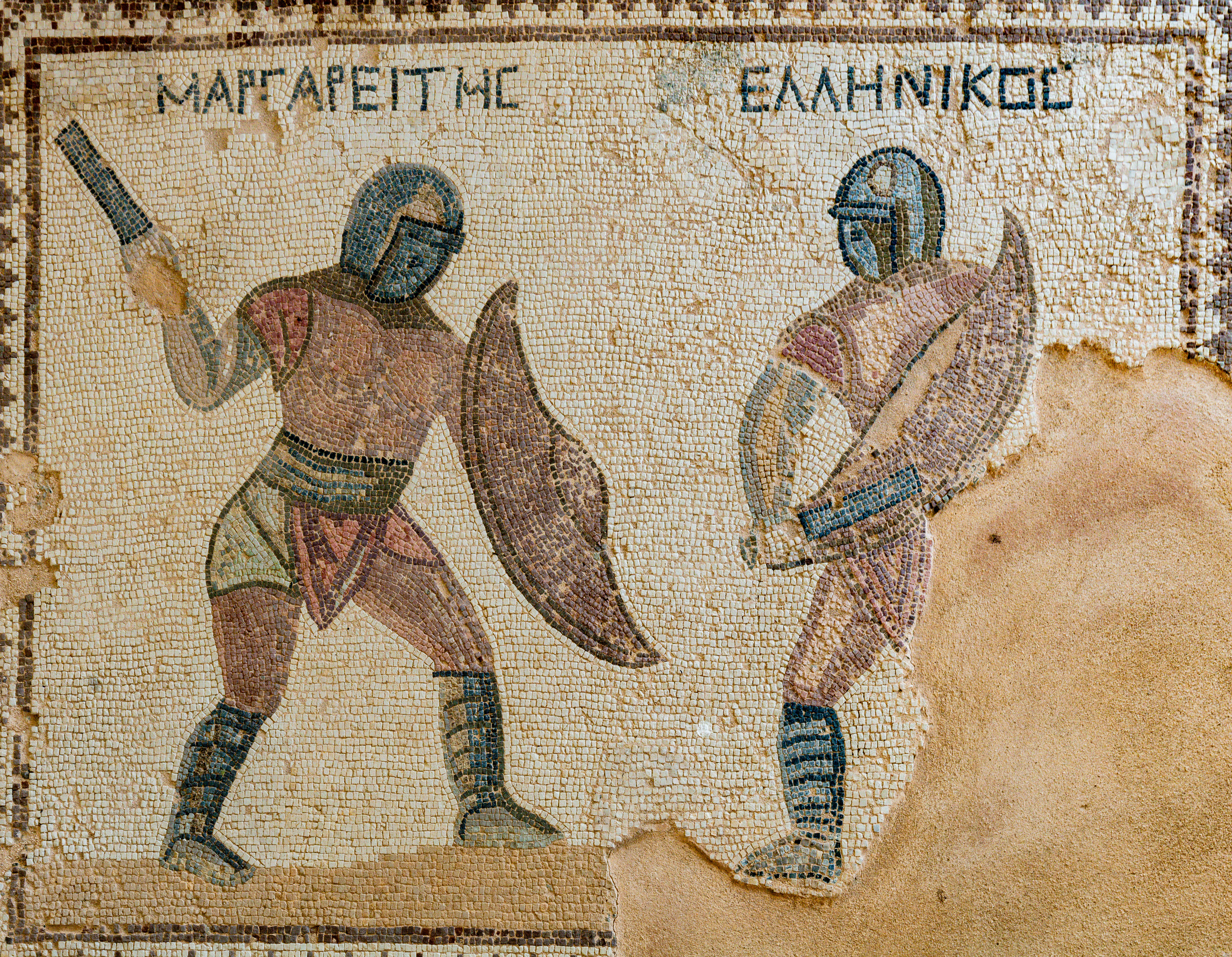
Mosaic of two gladiators, Margarites (left) and Hellenikos (right), late-3rd century CE, House of the Gladiators

The so-called House of the Gladiators is located south and east of the House of Achilles. The structure dates to the late-3rd century CE and has been interpreted as an elite-private residence, or perhaps more probably as a public palaestra. The later interpretation is supported by the absence of many rooms appropriate for living spaces and that the structure was entered from the east through the attached bath complex.

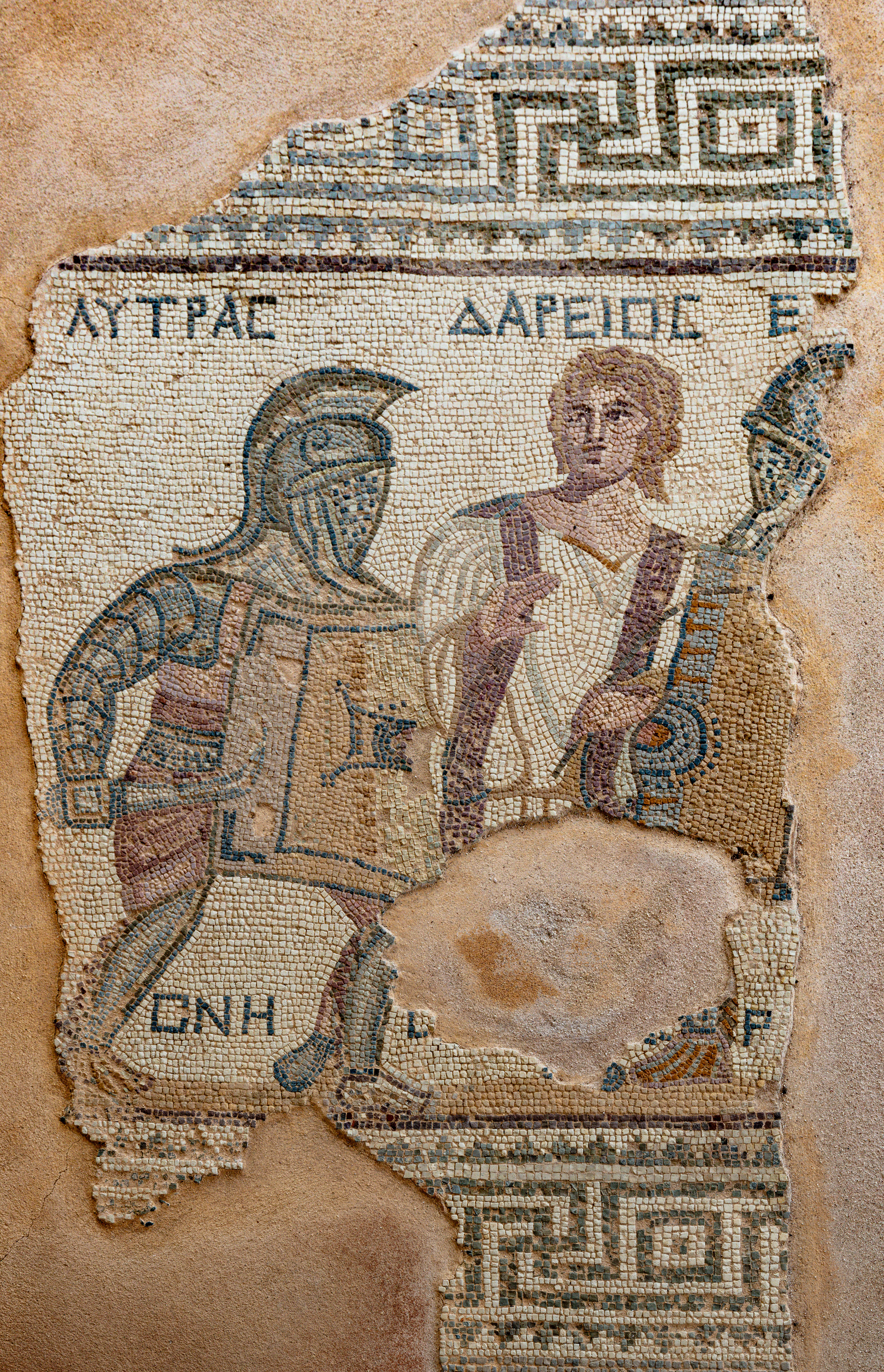
Mosaic of gladiators being separated by a referee, late-3rd century CE, House of the Gladiators

The main wing of the structure is arranged around a central peristyle courtyard. The northern and eastern portico of the atrium contains two panels depicting gladiators in combat, the only such mosaics in Cyprus. The structure was extensively damaged in the earthquakes of the late-4th century, but the east rooms seem to have been used until the mid-7th century.

=== House of Achilles ===
The House of Achilles is located at the northwestern extent of the acropolis, at the southern end of a saddle connecting the acropoline promontory to the hills to the north and west. In antiquity, it was located outside the walls near the proposed site of the Paphos Gate. Constructed in the early fourth century CE, it has been interpreted as an apantitirion, or a public reception hall for imperial and provincial dignitaries. Its precise function remains unknown.

The structure is arranged around a central peristyle courtyard, its northeastern portico retaining fragmentarily preserved mosaic pavements in the northeastern portico. The most important of these mosaic depicts the unveiling of Achilles's identity by Odysseus in the court of Lycomedes of Skyros when his mother, Thetis, had hidden him there amongst the women so that he might not be sent to war against the Trojans. Another room contains a fragmentary mosaic depicting Thetis bathing Achilles for the first time. In yet another room a fragmentary mosaic depicts the Rape of Ganymede. The structure was destroyed in the earthquakes of the late fourth century CE, likely the 365/370 earthquake.

=== "Earthquake house" ===
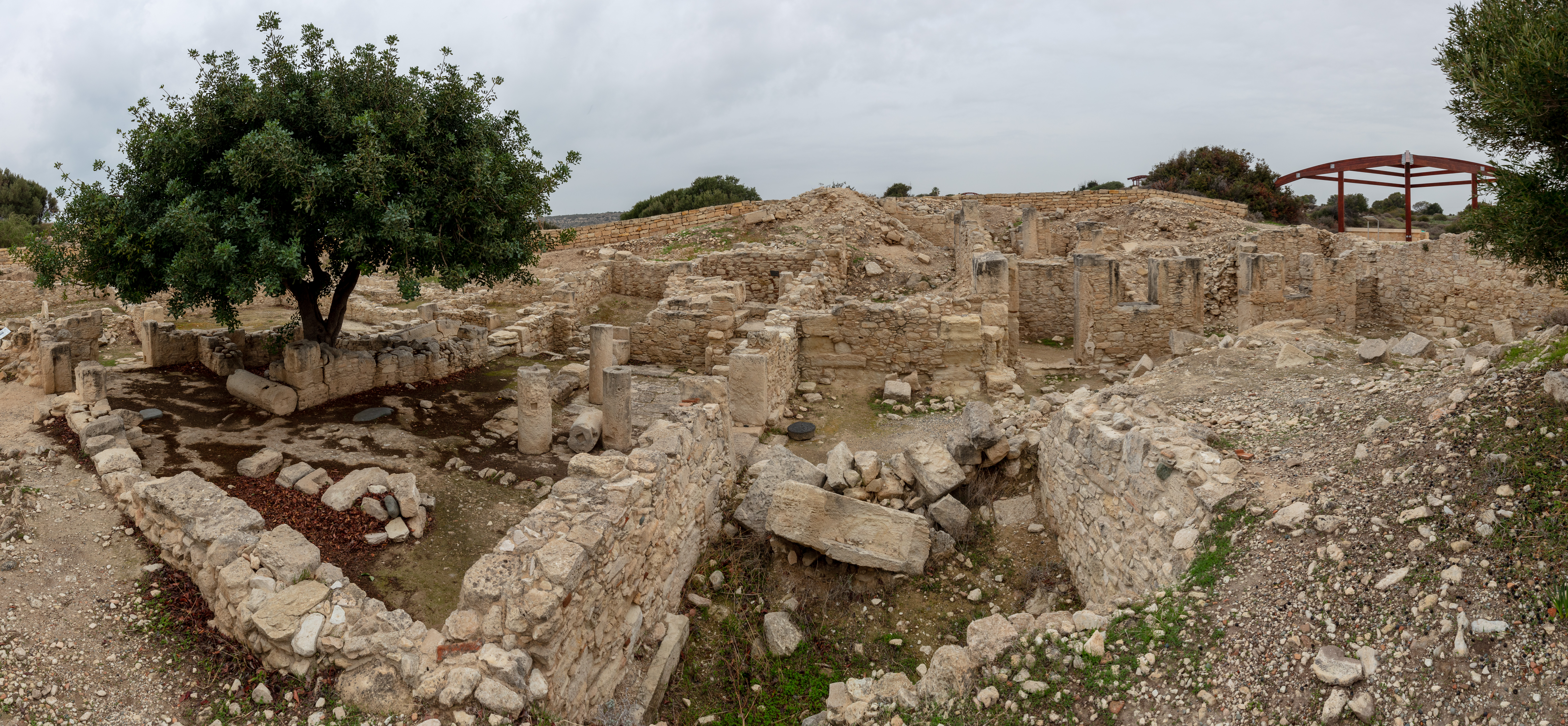
Earthquake house

Located 155 m southeast of the Early Christian Basilica, and 95 m northeast of the cliffs are the remains of a domestic structure containing dramatic evidence of the CE 365-370 earthquakes that destroyed many of the excavated structures on the acropolis.

The earthquake house, in its initial phases was likely constructed in the late first or early second centuries CE. Throughout its use it was subsequently reused and redesigned with interior spaces being subdivided and the structure expanded to fit the changing needs of its inhabitants.

Its destruction in the earthquakes of the late fourth century, and the absence of rebuilding in this area of the city subsequently provides a dramatic view on non-elite life at Kourion. Among the evidence of destruction found were the remains of two sets of human skeletal remains postured in an embrace, the remains of a juvenile who had fallen from the upper floor into the stable area when the floor collapsed, the remains of a young adult woman with an infant being held by an adult male approximately twenty-five years old, and three sets of adult male skeletal remains between the ages of 25 and 40. The remains of a mule were found in the stable area, its remains still chained to a limestone trough.

The earthquake house, initially uncovered in a sounding by the University of Pennsylvania Museum expedition was excavated by Soren between 1984 and 1987. Archaeological investigations were continued in 2014 with excavations by the Kourion Urban Space Project.

=== Forum, nymphaeum and forum baths ===
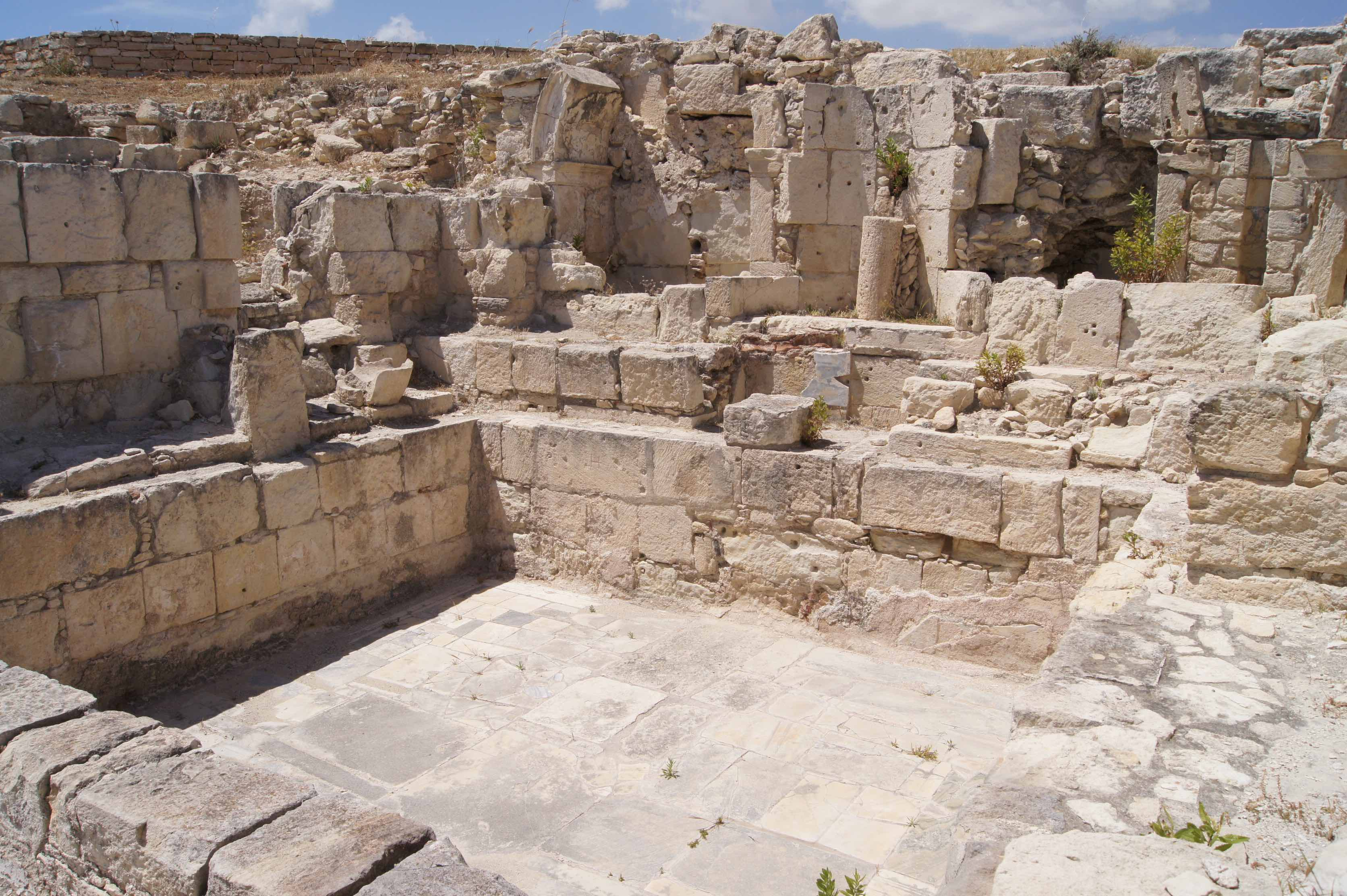
Nympheum, Kourion

The forum of Kourion, as it appears today, was constructed in the late second or early third centuries. The forum, the centre of public life, consisted of a central pavement with colonnaded porticoes set along its east, north and western sides. The eastern portico measured 65 m in length and 4.5 m wide, with a colonnade facing the courtyard, and a wall forming frontage of shops to the west. The northern portico provided access to a monumental nymphaeum and a bath complex thermae constructed around the nymphaeum to the north. The western portico was renovated in the early fifth century to provide an entrance to the episcopal precinct, located immediately to the west.

The nymphaeum, was developed in four successive phases from the early first century CE to the mid seventh century, and was among the largest nymphaea in the Roman Mediterranean in the second and third centuries. In its earliest phase the nymphaeum consisted of a rectangular room with a tri-apsidal fountain set in its northern wall flowing into a rectangular basin along the length of the same wall. After an earthquake in 77 CE, the nymphaeum was rebuilt between 98 and 117. The nymphaeum was internally dived by a courtyard with a room to the south containing an apsidal fountain and rectangular basins. In this phase, the nymphaeum measured 45 m long and 15 m wide. After its destruction in the earthquakes of the late fourth century, the nymphaeum was rebuilt as a three-aisled basilica with apses along the southern wall. This structure was used as a temporary church between 370 and 410 during the construction of the ecclesiastical precinct to the west. It was abandoned in the mid seventh century.

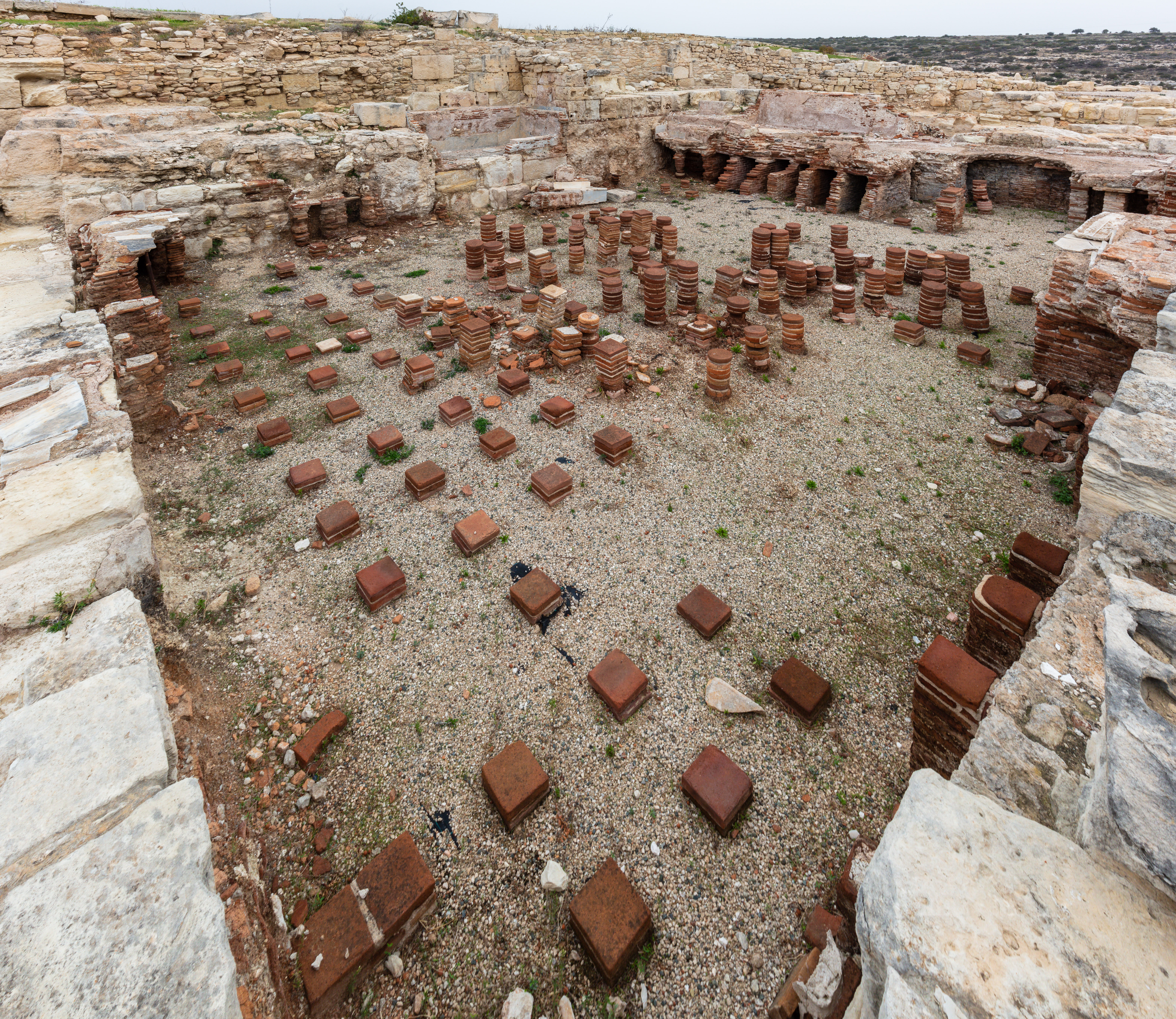
The baths

The baths, which surround the nymphaeum at the northwestern end of the forum, were constructed in the early to mid fourth century CE following repairs to the nymphaeum. The baths were divided into east and west wings by the nymphaeum. The eastern baths were arranged around a central corridor which opened onto a sudatorium, a caldarium, and a tepidarium to the north. The western baths possessed a series of axially aligned baths along the northwest wall of the nymphaeum.

=== Stadium ===
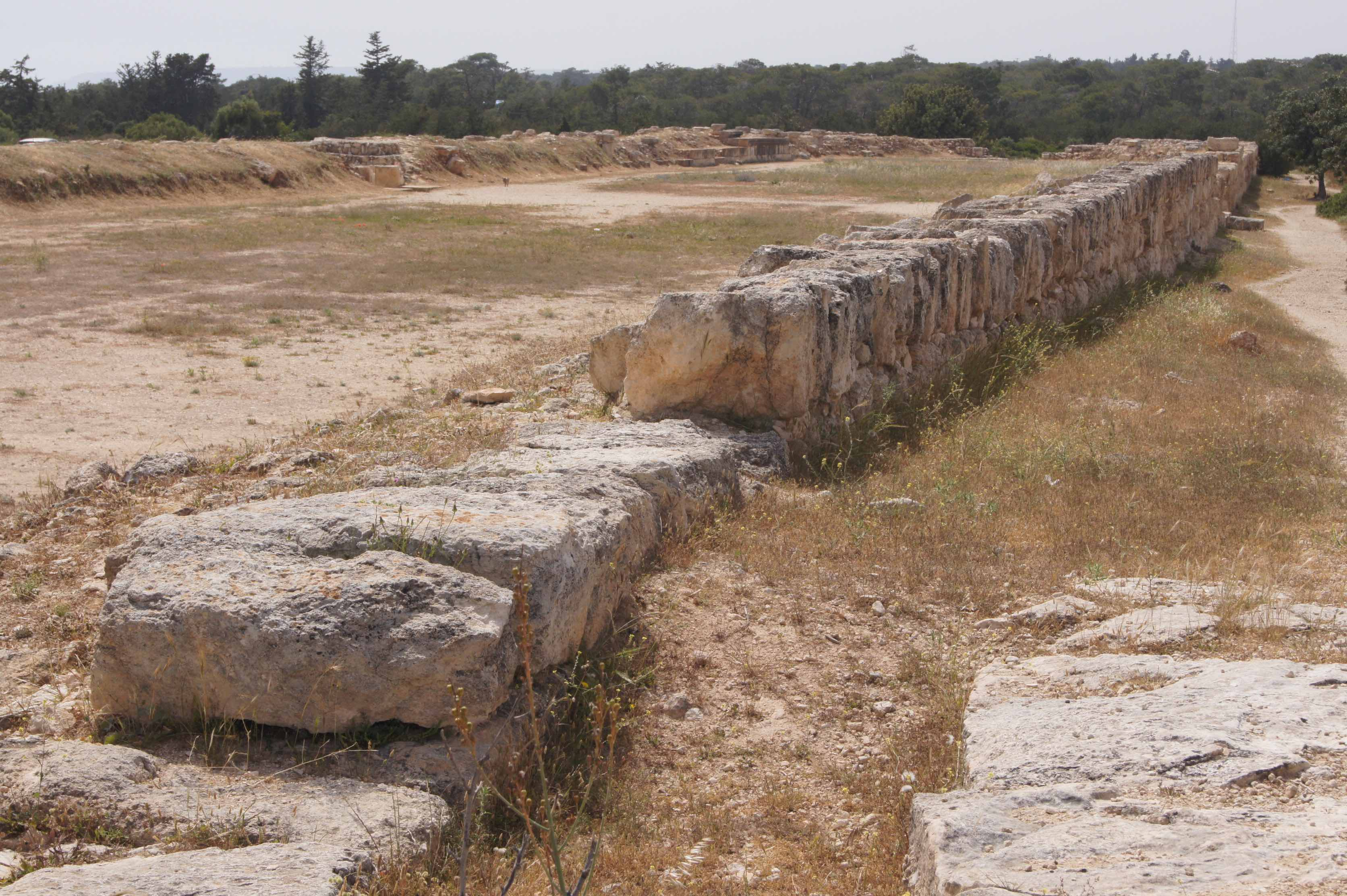
The stadium

The stadium of Kourion, located 0.5 km west of the acropolis and 1.1 km east of the Sanctuary of Apollo Hylates, was constructed during the Antonine period (c. 138–180). The stadia at Kourion was 187 m long with a starting line marked by two circular stone posts, set wide enough to accommodate eight runners. The dromos was enclosed on the north, west and south by a free-standing curved seating structure measuring 217 m long and 17 m wide. This structure consisted of seven rows of seating supported by a 6 m thick ashlar wall. Seating was probably accessed by stairs set at 10 m intervals along the exterior. The dromos was accessed through gaps in the seating in the middle of its north, south and western sides. This structure provided sufficient seating for approximately 6,000 spectators. In its entirety the stadium measured 229 m long and 24 m wide. The stadium was abandoned in later-half of the 4th century. It remains the only excavated stadium in Cyprus.

=== House and Baths of Eustolios ===
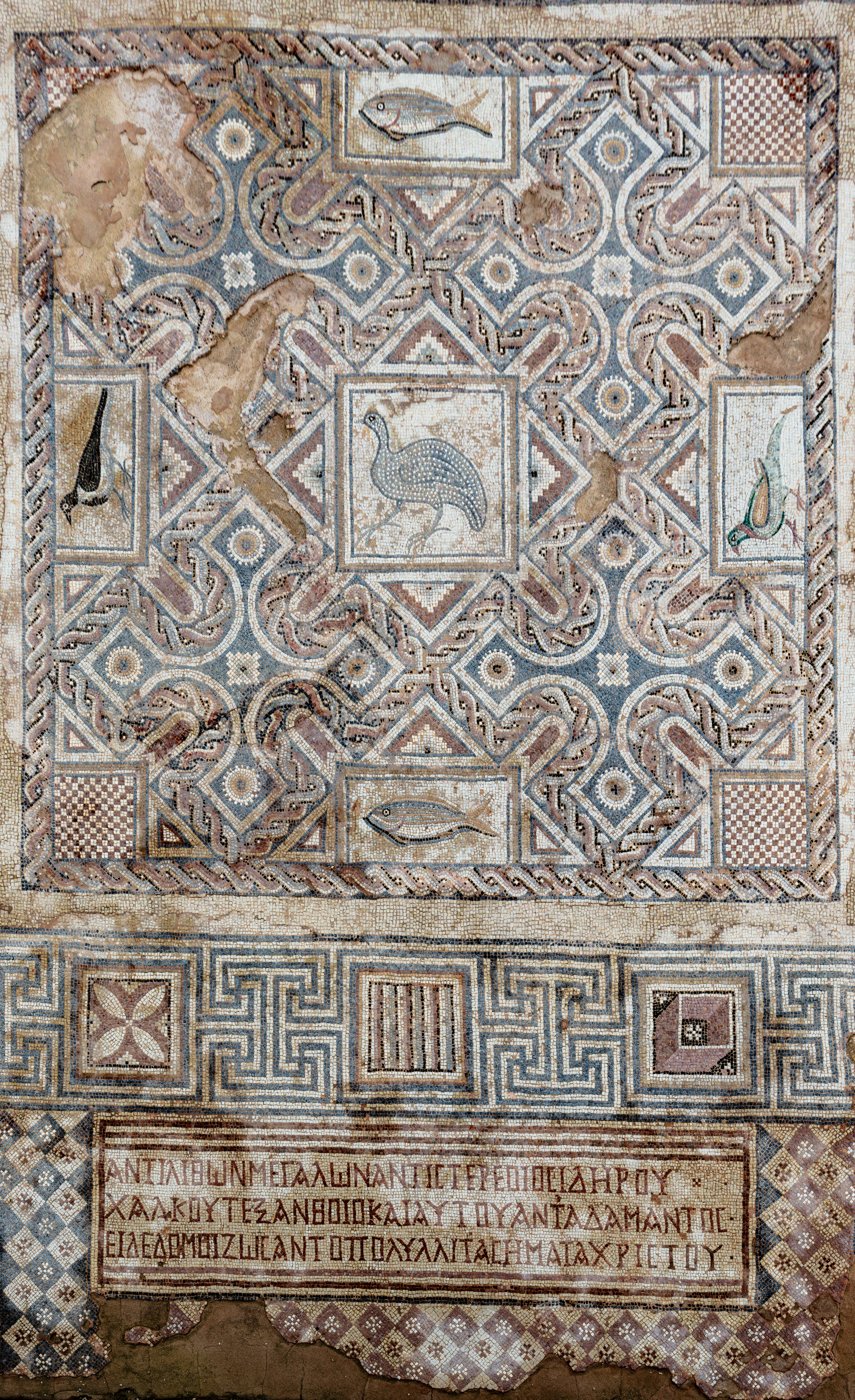
Mosaic in the complex of Eustolios at Kourion

The House and Baths of Eustolios, situated on the crest of the southern cliffs immediately above the theatre, was constructed in the late-fourth century over the remains of a structure destroyed in the mid-4th century. In the early years of the fifth century, soon after the completion of the house, a bathing complex was constructed along the house's northern side. The household and bath annex on the northern side contains more than thirty rooms. The complex was entered from the west, the visitor passing into a rectangular forecourt. A salutatory inscription in the vestibule beyond the forecourt reads, "Enter for the good luck of the house." Rooms were arranged north and south of this forecourt and the vestibule, including a peristyle courtyard to the south at its eastern extent. The southern peristyle was arranged around a central pool and is the centrepiece of the household, its porticoes adorned with elaborate mosaics. A mosaic inscription in the eastern portico identifies the building as Eustolios, who built the structure to alleviate the suffering of the populace of Kourion, presumably in response to the earthquakes of the mid-to-late 4th century. The inscription identifies Eustolios as a Christian, concluding, "this house is girt by the much venerated signs of Christ." The accompanying iconography includes figural depictions of fish and birds (grey goose, guinea hen, falcon, partridge and pheasant).

The bathing complex is arranged around a central rectangular hall and included a frigidarium with an antechamber, a tepidarium, and a caldarium. The frigidarium is paved with a figural mosaic depicting a personification of Ktisis (Creation) holding an architect's ruler. The complex remained in use until its destruction in the mid-7th century. The household was probably constructed as a private elite-residence, but was converted into a publicly-accessible bathing facility in the early-fifth century.

=== Episcopal precinct and cathedral of Kourion ===
The cathedral and episcopal precinct of Kourion, located along the crest of the cliffs immediately southwest of the forum, was constructed at the beginning of the fifth-century and renovated successively in the sixth century. This cathedral, the seat (cathedra) of the Bishop of Kourion, was a monoapsidal, three-aisled basilica, constructed on an east–west orientation. The aisles were separated from the nave by colonnades of twelve columns set on plinths. The central nave's eastern terminus ended in a semicircular hemidomed apse with a synthronon. The basilica was magnificently appointed according to its importance within the ecclesiastical structure of Cypriot Christianity. Its walls were revetted in white marble. The altar was enclosed within a chancel screen, and covered within a four-posted baldachin. The aisles were paved in opus sectile while the nave was paved with polychrome mosaics. The complex included a narthex, arrayed along the western facade of the basilica, and peristyle atria to the west and north of the narthex. The northern atrium provided access to the episcopal palace to its west, or to the baptistery, diakoinon and catchecumena along the northern side of the basilica.

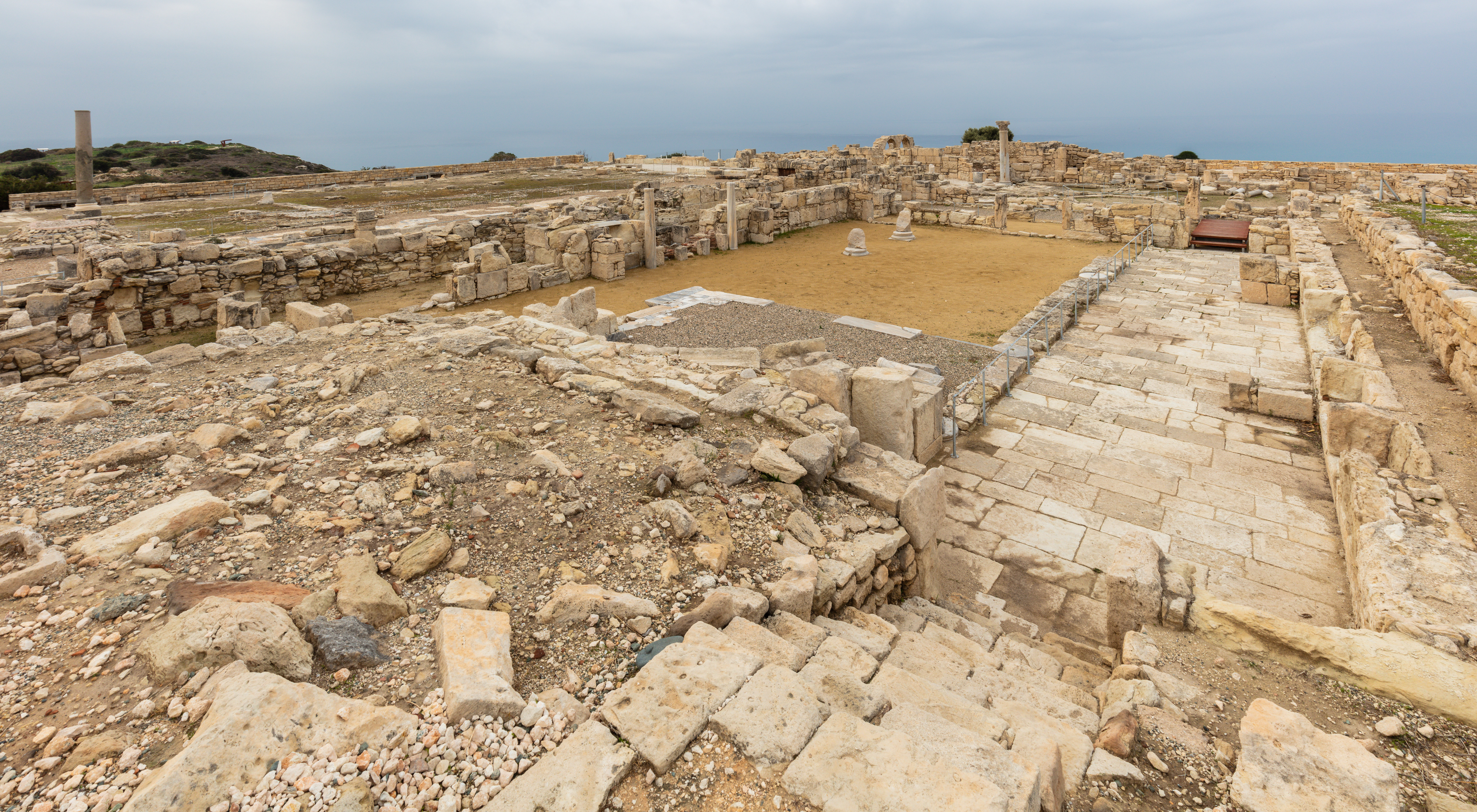
The Diakoinon in the Basilica

The precinct was constructed at the end of the fourth and very beginning of the fifth centuries CE, a time in which Kourion was recovering from the devastation of the earthquakes of 365/370. The allocation of such resources to this basilica, as well as the concurrent abandonment of the Sanctuary of Apollo Hylates, indicates the centrality Christianity had assumed to the city's religious institutions. The precinct was destroyed during the Arab raids of the seventh century, after which the seat of the Bishop of Kourion was moved inland

=== Northwestern basilica ===
In the late-fifth century, another tri-apsidal, three-aisled basilica was constructed on the height northwest of the acropolis on the northern side of the road between the acropolis and the Sanctuary of Apollo Hylates. In Classical antiquity this may have been the site of a sanctuary dedicated to Demeter and Kore, as evidenced by a dedicatory inscription found at the site, though the remains of this sanctuary have not been located.

The basilica was constructed on an easterly orientation. The central nave and aisles were paved with marble slabs. The central apse possessed a synthronon for the clergy, with the chancel set apart from the nave by marble screens and an opus sectile pavement. The basilica was accessed through a colonnaded peristyle courtyard and narthex west of the basilica. The atrium was entered from its northern and southern sides. The peristyle courtyard was centred upon a rectangular cistern. Also accessed off the narthex and atrium were two catechumena, flanking the basilica to the north and south, and a diakoinon to the north. The basilica was abandoned in the mid-7th century during the early Arab raids on the southern coast of Cyprus.

=== Early Christian beachfront basilica ===
In the early-6th century, an early Christian basilica was constructed at the base of the southwestern bluffs, below the acropolis, near the western extent of the unexcavated harbor area. The church was a tri-apsidal, three-aisled basilica that measured approximately 27.5 m in length and 14 m in width on its exterior. It was oriented with the altar facing southeast. The central nave measured approximately 25 m including the apse, and 5.5 m wide, with the flanking aisles being 2.75 m in width. The colonnades supporting the clerestory ceiling of the nave consisted of six corinthian columns. The eastern ends of the aisles and nave terminated in half-domes adorned with mosaics. The chancel was paved with opus sectile while the nave and aisles were paved in mosaics. A peristyle atrium was arrayed west of the basilica, with a baptistery opening off the northern portico, and access to the basilica complex being controlled through the southern portico. The peristyle courtyard was centered upon a well. A catechumena was arrayed along the southern aisle of the basilica and was accessed from the southeast corner of the atrium. The basilica was abandoned in the mid-seventh century, the time of the earliest Arab raids on Cypriot coastal cities.

== See also ==
- List of ancient Greek cities
- Cities of the ancient Near East
- Kition
- Idalium
