= Larnaca =

Larnaca Λάρνακα (Greek) Larnaka (Turkish) Larnaka
- City and municipality
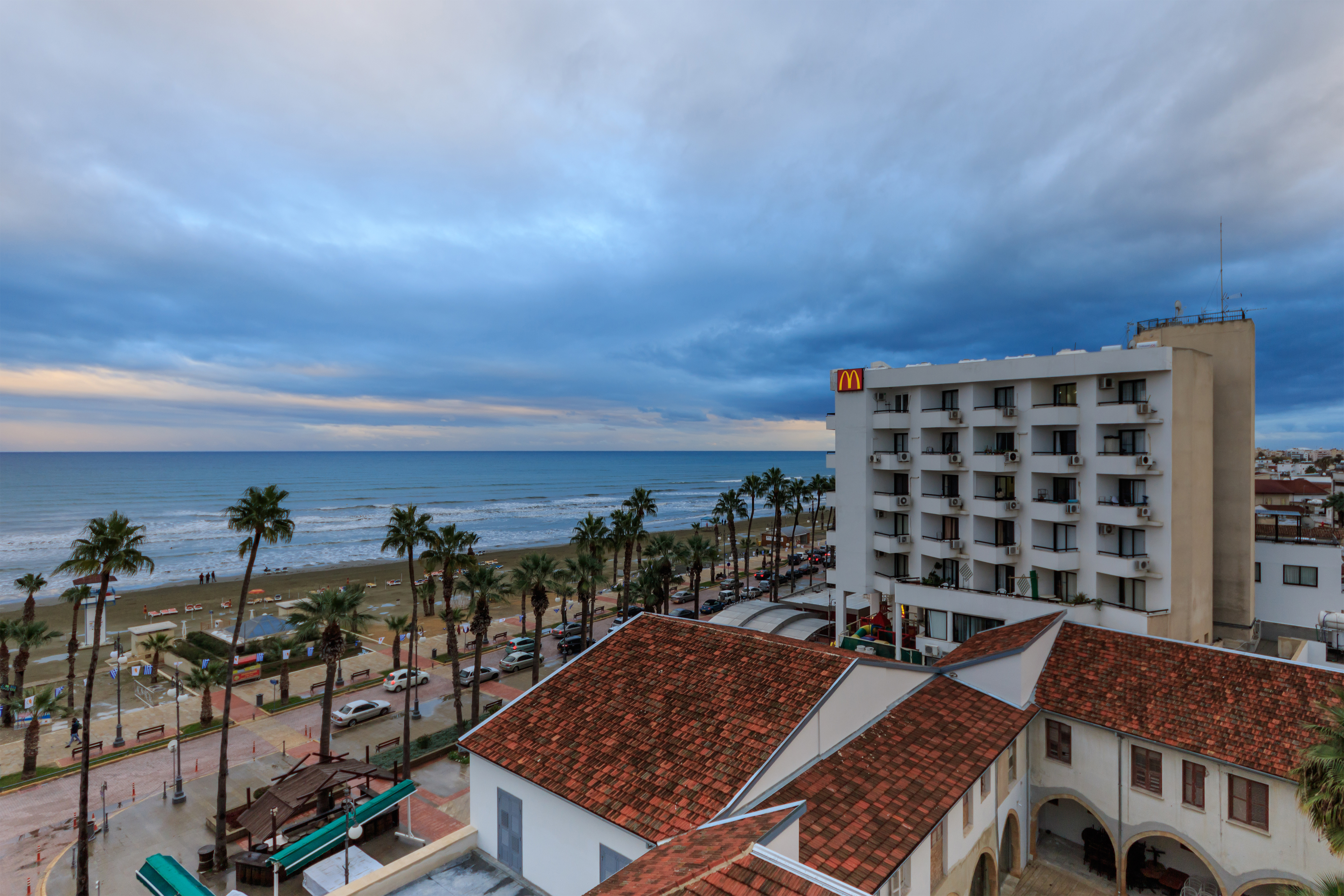
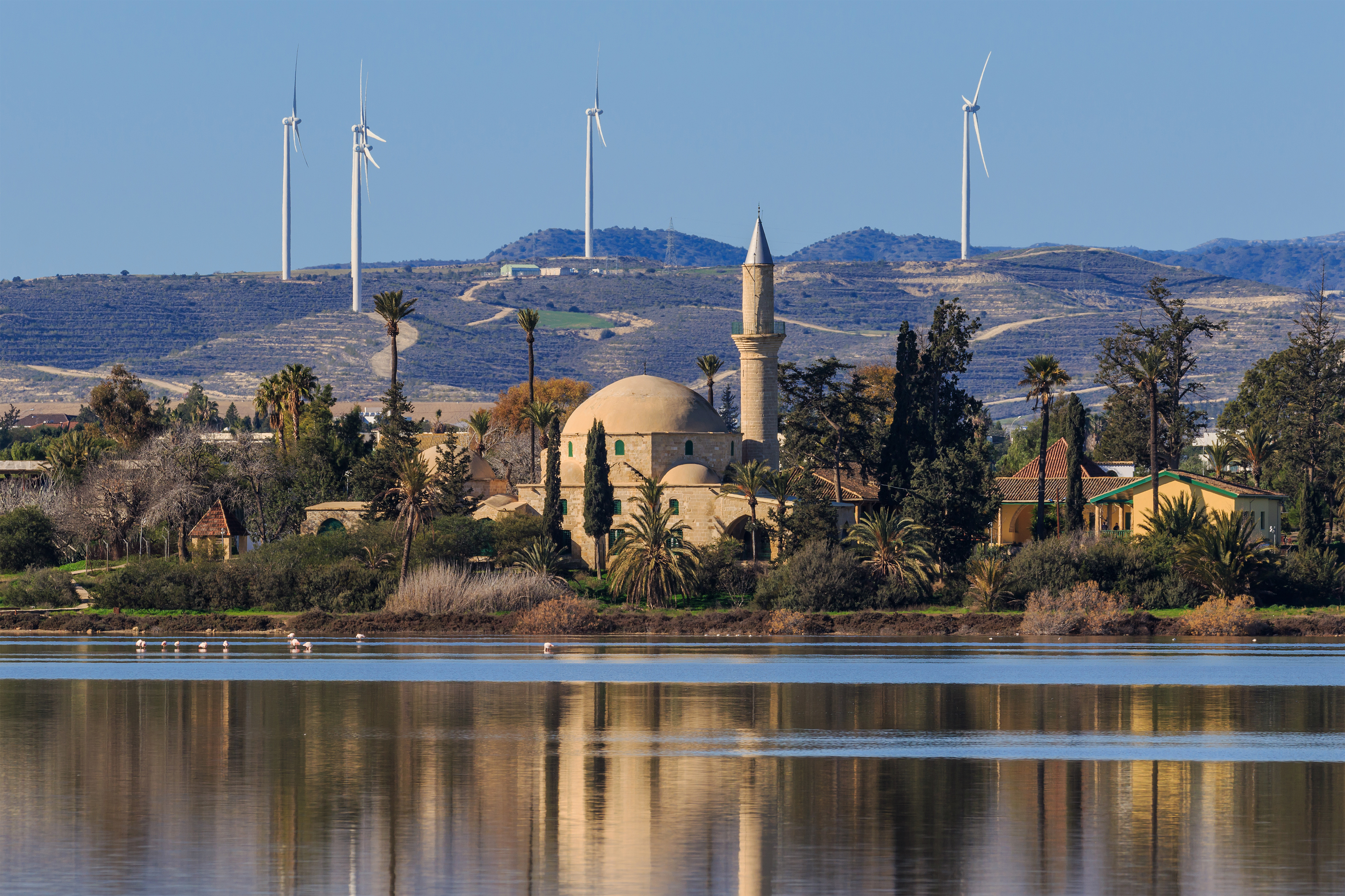
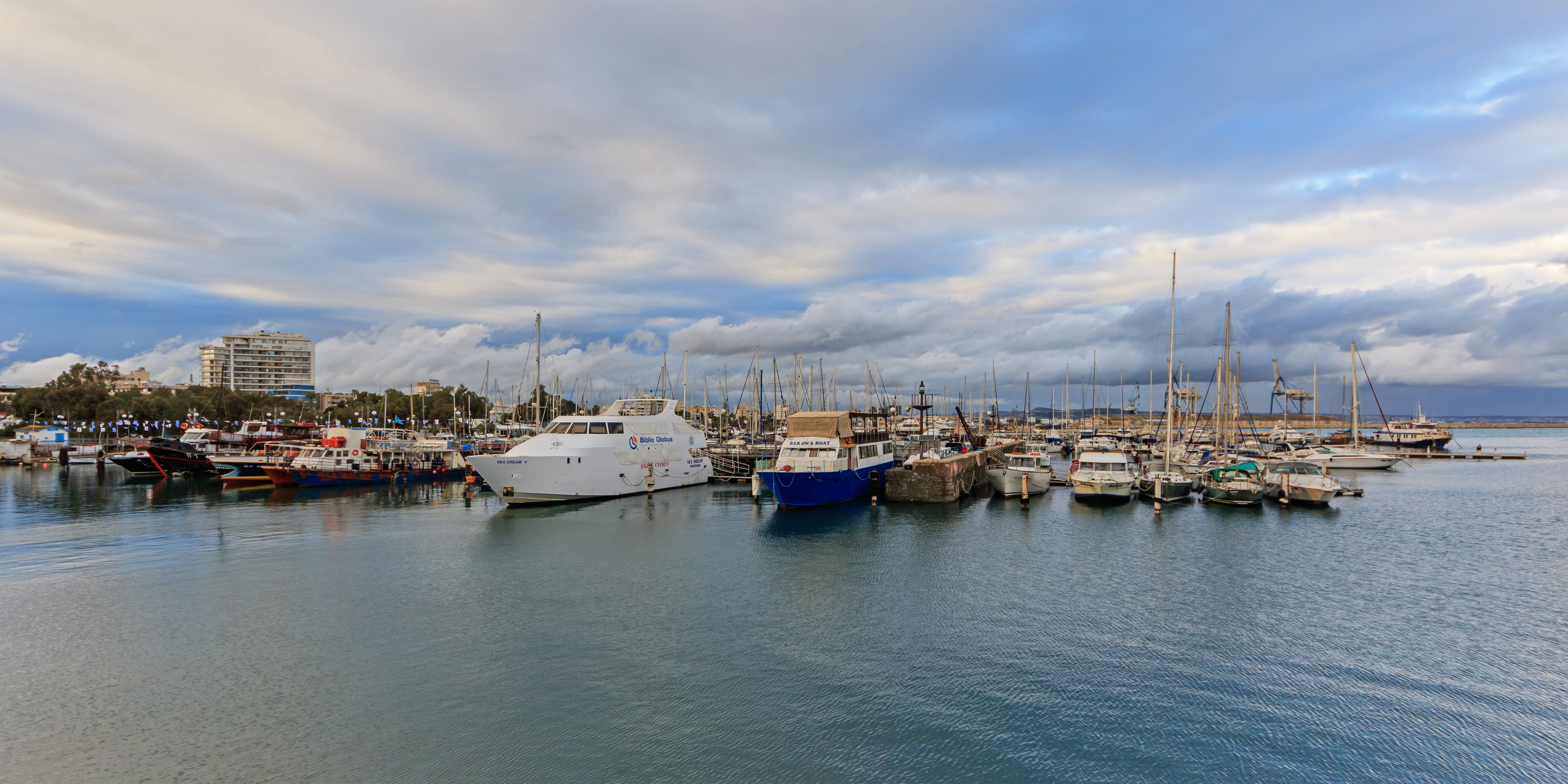
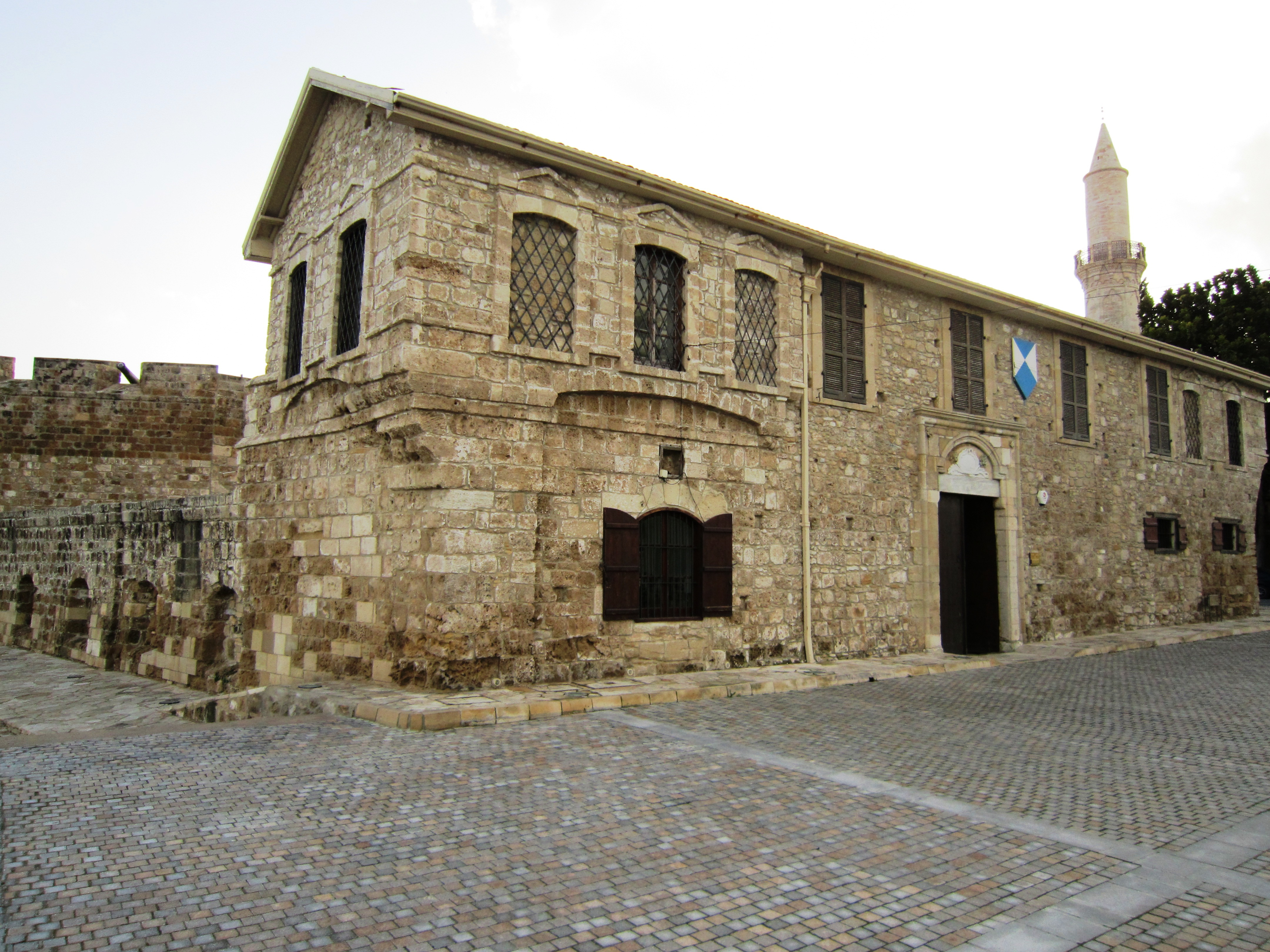
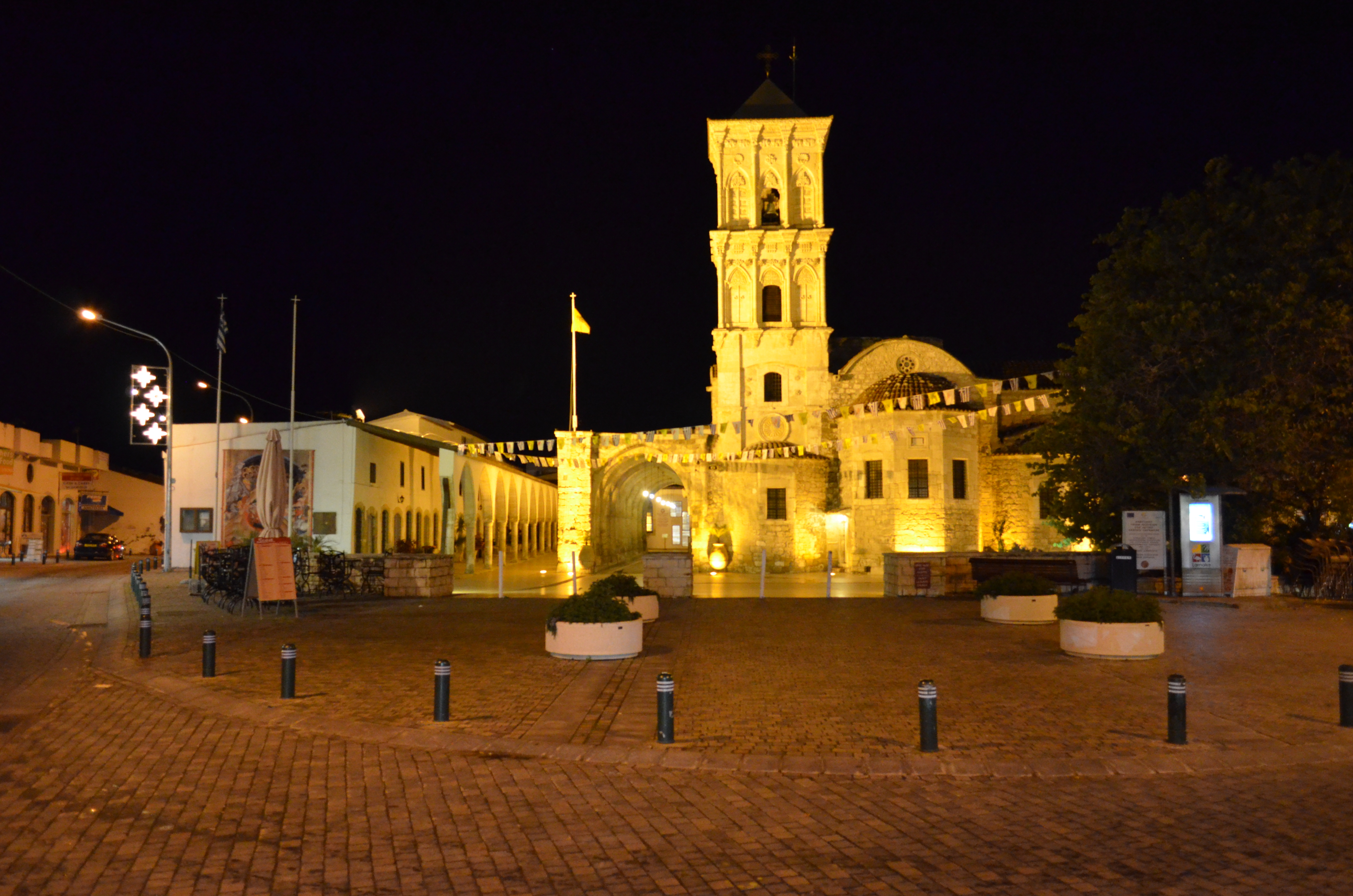
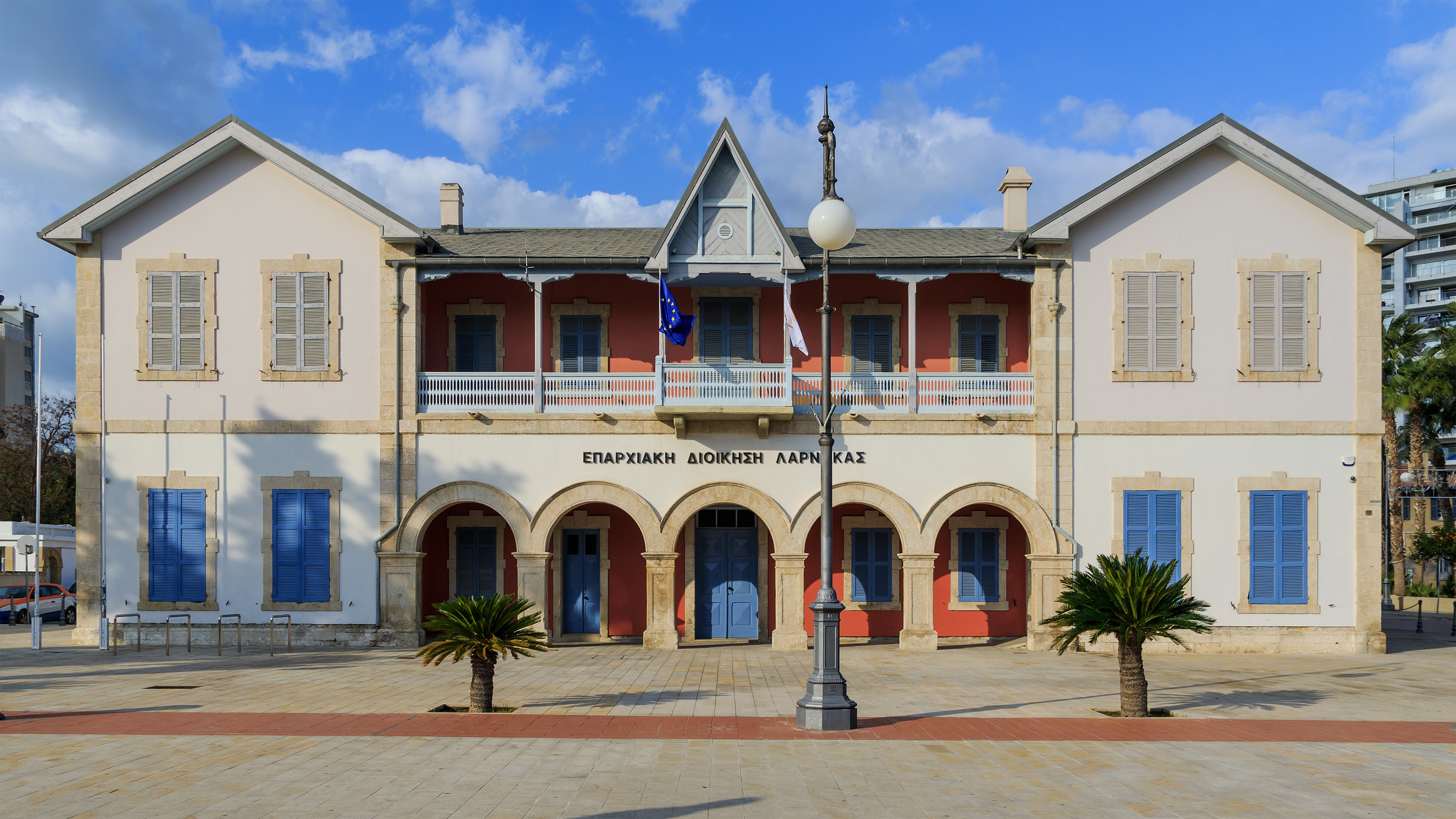
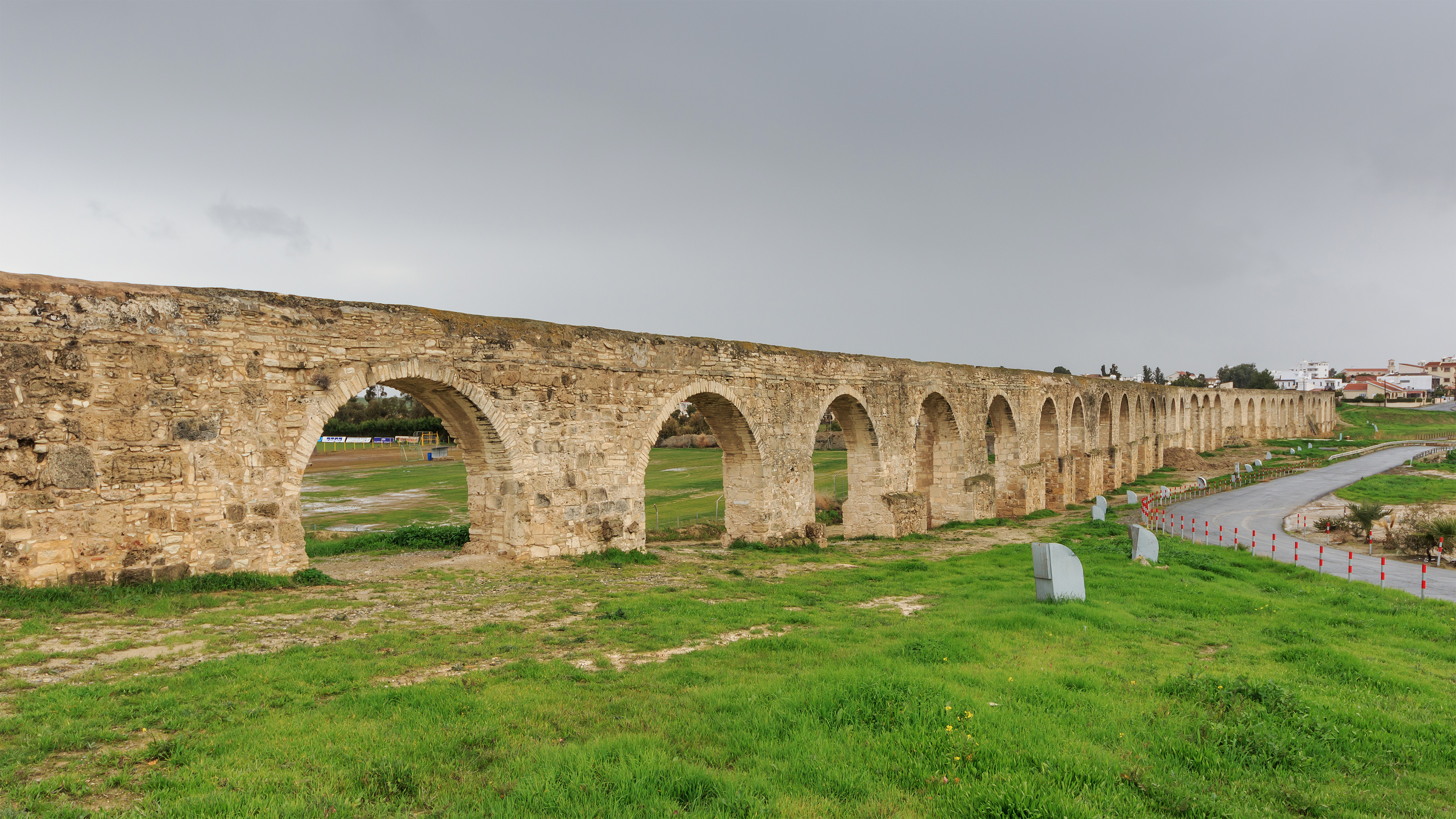
- Finikoudes Promenade Hala Sultan Tekke Larnaca Marina Larnaca Castle St Lazarus Church Larnaca District Administration Kamares Aqueduct
- Nickname: "Skala" from Greek: "Σκάλα"; in Turkish: "İskele"
- Interactive map of Larnaca
- Location within Cyprus Location within the European Union
- Coordinates: 34°55′N 33°38′E
- Country: Cyprus
- District: Larnaca District

Government
  - Type: Municipal council
  - Mayor: Andreas Vyras (AKEL)

Area
  - Municipality: 32.85 km^{2} (12.68 sq mi)
  - Urban: 118.62 km^{2} (45.80 sq mi)
- Elevation: 26 m (85 ft)

Population (2021)
  - Municipality: 52,038
  - Rank: 4th municipality, 3rd urban in Cyprus
  - Urban: 130.000
  - Urban density: 1.0959/km^{2} (2.8385/sq mi)
  - District: 155,753
- (Note: The urban population is the aggregate of the populations of Larnaca, Aradippou, Livadia, Dromolaxia, and Meneou.)
- Demonym(s): Larnacan(s) (en); Larnakiotis, (masc.), Larnakiotissa (fem.) (gr), Skaliotis, (masc.), Skaliotissa (fem.) (gr, colloquial)
- Time zone: UTC+2 (EET)
  - Summer (DST): UTC+3 (EEST)
- Post code: 6010-6060
- Area code: 24
- Patron saint: Saint Lazarus (12 April 2025)
- Major airport(s): Larnaca International Airport
- Website: www.larnaka.org.cy

Larnaca, (Note: /ˈlɑːrnəkə/; Greek: Λάρνακα, romanized: Lárnaka [ˈlarnaka]; Turkish: Larnaka) also spelled Larnaka, is a city on the southeast coast of Cyprus and the capital of the Larnaca District. With a district population of 155,000 in 2021, it is the third largest city in the country after Nicosia and Limassol.

Built on the ruins of Kition, an Ancient Greek city-state and the birthplace of Stoic philosopher Zeno of Citium, Larnaca is home to the Church of Saint Lazarus, Hala Sultan Tekke, the Kamares Aqueduct, Larnaca Castle, Larnaca District Archaeological Museum, and Pierides Museum. It attracts many visitors to its beaches, as well as to Finikoudes (Φοινικούδες; Greek for "palm trees"), the city's signature seafront promenade lined with palm trees. It gives its name to the country's primary airport, Larnaca International Airport, which is situated in the neighbouring village of Dromolaxia rather than Larnaca proper. It also has a seaport and a marina.

== Name ==
The name Larnaca originates from the Ancient Greek noun λάρναξ larnax meaning 'coffer', 'box' or 'chest', e.g. for household stores; and by extension, 'cinerary urn', 'sarcophagus', 'coffin'; 'drinking trough', or 'chalice'. An informal etymology attributes the origin of the name to the many larnakes (sarcophagi) that have been found in the area. Sophocles Hadjisavvas, a state archeologist, states that "[the city's U.S.] consul of the last quarter of the 19th century, claimed to have explored more than 3,000 tombs in the area of Larnaca, so-called after the immense number of sarcophagi found in the modern town".

The city is also colloquially known as "Skala", from the Greek noun σκάλα, meaning ladder. In Turkish it has been translated to İskele. This name referred to the historic port of the city, though now it is the name of the area which surrounds it, in which the Turkish Cypriot inhabitants of the city lived prior to the Turkish invasion of Cyprus. After which they migrated to Trikomo, which was later renamed to Yeni İskele (meaning "New Skala"), in honour of their origins.

== History ==
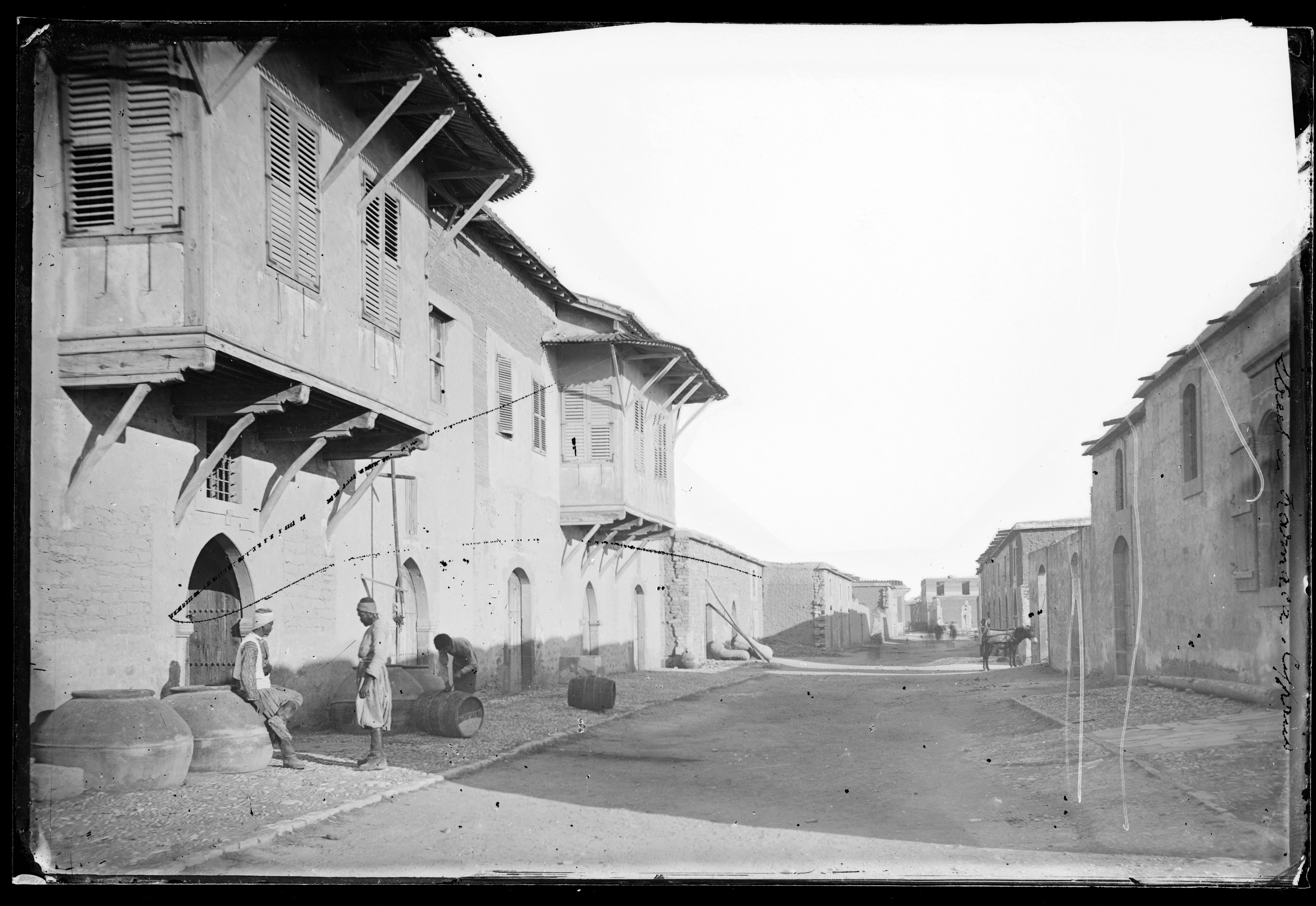
Street in Larnaca in 1878

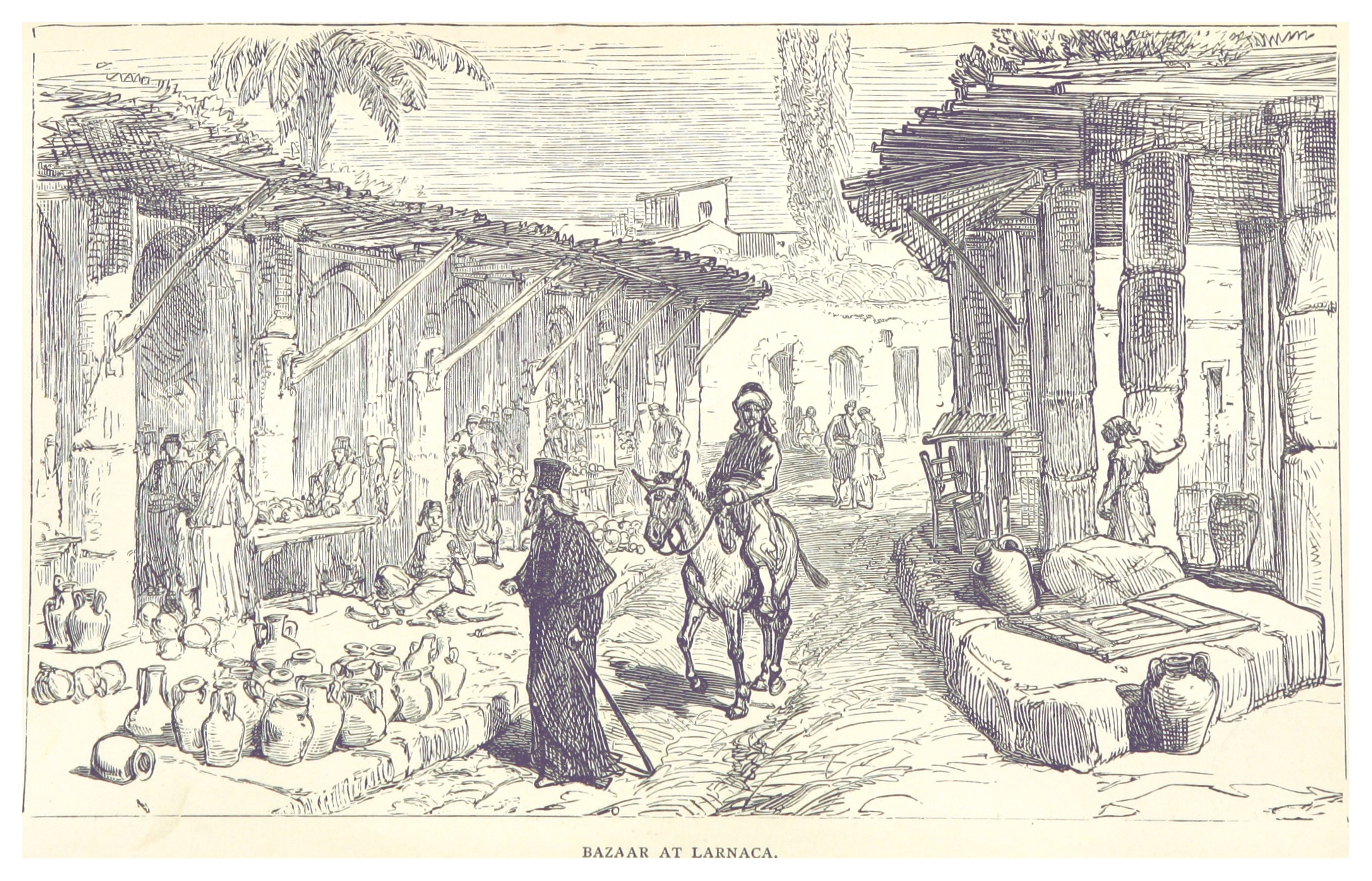
1880 drawing of market in Larnaca

The former city-kingdom of Kition was originally established in the 13th century BC. New cultural elements appearing between 1200 BC and 1000 BC, including pottery, new architectural forms. These archaeological findings are interpreted as indications of significant political changes and the arrival of the Achaeans, the first Greek colonists of Kition. Around the same time, Phoenicians settled the area.

At the archaeological sites of Kiteon, remains that date from the 13th century BC have been found. Around 1000 BC, Kition was rebuilt by Phoenicians and it subsequently became a center of Phoenician culture. The remains of the sites include cyclopean walls and a complex of five temples and a naval port.

It was conquered in the first millennium BC by a series of great powers of the region. First by the Assyrian Empire, then by Egypt. Like most Cypriot cities, Kition belonged to the Persian Achaemenid Empire. In 450 BC, the Athenian general Cimon died at sea, while militarily supporting the revolt against Persia's rule over Cyprus. On his deathbed, he urged his officers to conceal his death from both their allies and the Persians.

Strong earthquakes hit the city in 76 AD and the year after.

Earthquakes of 322 AD and 342 "caused the destruction not only of Kition but also of Salamis and Pafos". Kition's harbor silted up, and the population moved to the seafront farther south, sometime after this. Contributing factors to the silting are thought to have been earthquakes, deforestation, and overgrazing.

The commercial port was located at Skala, during the Ottoman Period starting in 1571. Skala is the name of the seashore immediately south of the Larnaca Castle and its neighborhood.

== Geography ==
The Salt Lake fills with water during the winter season and is visited by flocks of flamingoes who stay there from November until the end of March. It usually dries up in the summer. In the past, it yielded good quality salt scraped from the dried surface. The salt from the lake is now considered unsuitable for consumption.

=== Climate ===
The climate in this area is described by the Köppen Climate Classification System as a hot semi-arid climate (BSh) due to its low annual rainfall and hot summer temperatures resulting in highly negative water balance. It is sometimes described as a mediterranean climate due to the pronounced humid winters and dry summers, but the total annual rainfall is below the required amount to avoid the semi-arid classification.

Climate data for Larnaca (Larnaca International Airport) (1991–2020 normals, extremes 1881-present)
Month	Jan	Feb	Mar	Apr	May	Jun	Jul	Aug	Sep	Oct	Nov	Dec	Year
Record high °C (°F)	24.0 (75.2)	26.2 (79.2)	30.7 (87.3)	34.1 (93.4)	40.6 (105.1)	41.5 (106.7)	41.1 (106.0)	40.9 (105.6)	39.7 (103.5)	34.8 (94.6)	31.5 (88.7)	26.6 (79.9)	41.5 (106.7)
Mean daily maximum °C (°F)	17.1 (62.8)	17.5 (63.5)	19.9 (67.8)	23.0 (73.4)	27.0 (80.6)	30.6 (87.1)	33.0 (91.4)	33.3 (91.9)	31.4 (88.5)	28.3 (82.9)	23.3 (73.9)	18.9 (66.0)	25.3 (77.5)
Daily mean °C (°F)	12.4 (54.3)	12.6 (54.7)	14.5 (58.1)	17.6 (63.7)	21.7 (71.1)	25.3 (77.5)	27.8 (82.0)	28.2 (82.8)	26.0 (78.8)	22.9 (73.2)	18.2 (64.8)	14.3 (57.7)	20.1 (68.2)
Mean daily minimum °C (°F)	7.8 (46.0)	7.6 (45.7)	9.1 (48.4)	12.1 (53.8)	16.4 (61.5)	20.1 (68.2)	22.6 (72.7)	23.0 (73.4)	20.6 (69.1)	17.5 (63.5)	13.2 (55.8)	9.7 (49.5)	15.0 (59.0)
Record low °C (°F)	−0.9 (30.4)	−1.3 (29.7)	−1.0 (30.2)	2.0 (35.6)	8.5 (47.3)	12.5 (54.5)	16.0 (60.8)	15.6 (60.1)	12.4 (54.3)	7.6 (45.7)	1.9 (35.4)	0.6 (33.1)	−1.3 (29.7)
Average precipitation mm (inches)	83.2 (3.28)	47.4 (1.87)	30.3 (1.19)	15.8 (0.62)	11.5 (0.45)	2.1 (0.08)	0.7 (0.03)	0.4 (0.02)	5.2 (0.20)	16.0 (0.63)	42.0 (1.65)	95.4 (3.76)	350.1 (13.78)
Average relative humidity (%)	72	71	68	65	63	64	67	66	61	60	64	72	66
Mean monthly sunshine hours	181.4	189.4	243.0	273.6	338.4	378.6	394.4	370.3	314.7	272.5	214.5	177.1	3,348
Source 1: NOAA
Source 2: Meteo Climat (record highs and lows)

== Promenade ==
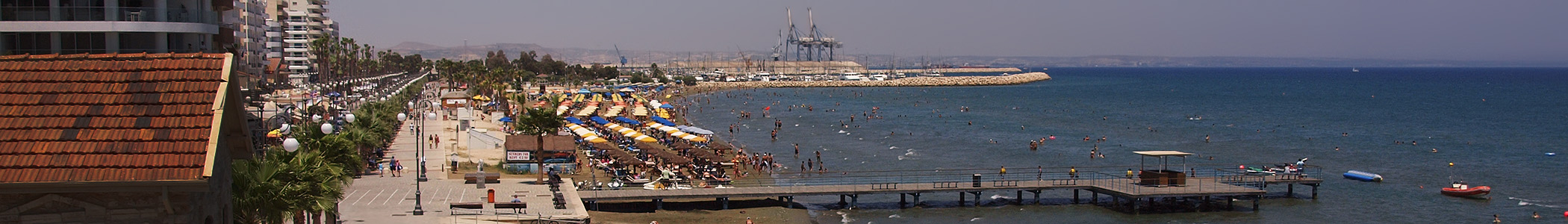
Panoramic view of Finikoudes beach

Finikoudes is the promenade along Athenon Avenue on the seafront. A row of palm trees (Cypriot Greek: φοινικούδες, foinikoudes) lines either side of it.

Much of the activity is centered on the city promenade during the major festivals. The most important of these is Kataklysmos or the Festival of the Flood, celebrated in early summer with a series of cultural events. The festival used to last for about a week, but, in recent years, with the increased commercialism of peripheral stalls, rides, and temporary Lokma restaurants, the festival has been extended to about three weeks, during which the seafront is closed to traffic in the evenings.

== Monuments ==
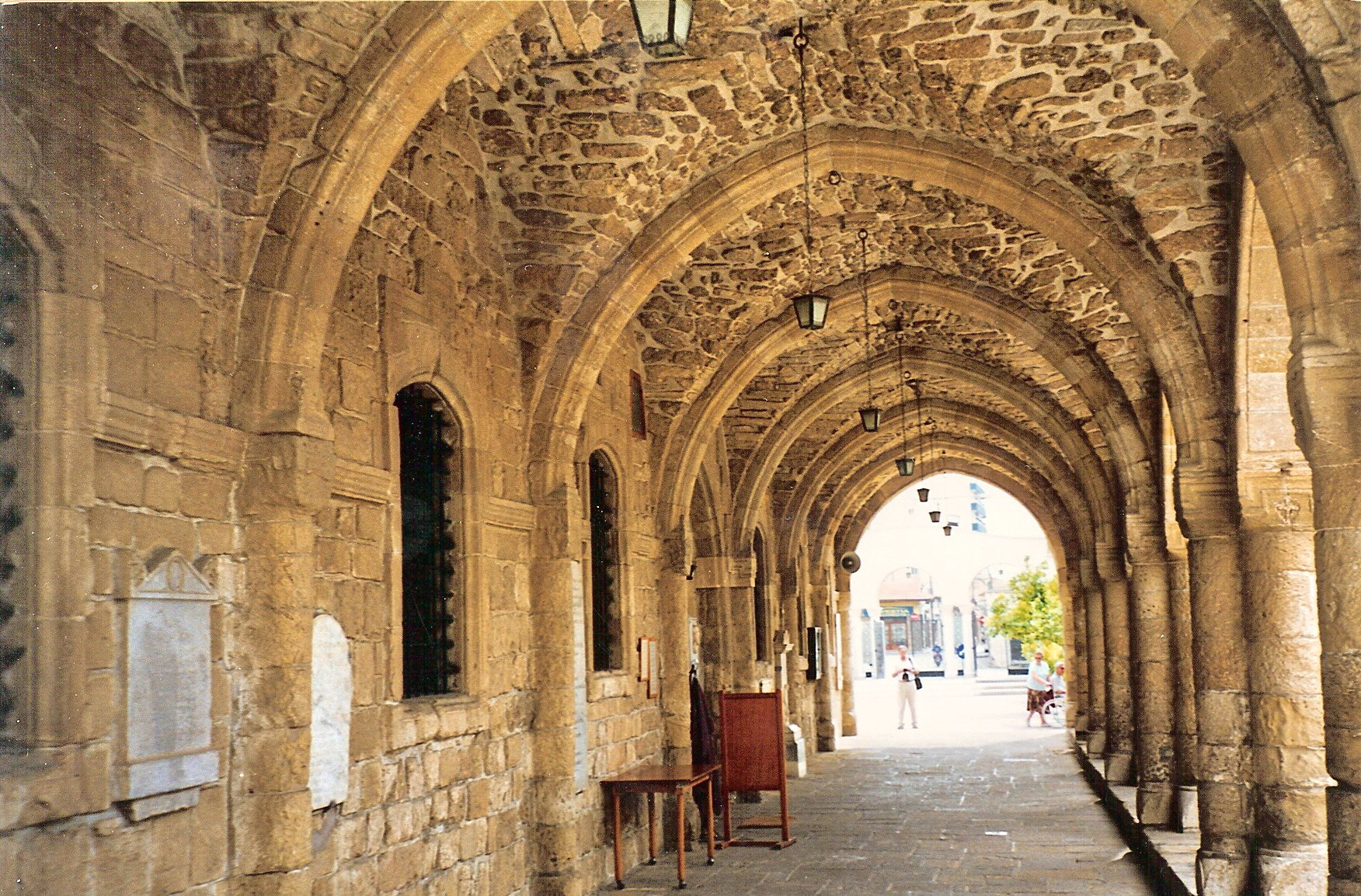
Church of Saint Lazarus, Larnaca

- A bust of Cimon stands on the Foinikoudes Promenade, with this quote referring to him on the pedestal: "Even in death he was victorious" (Greek: "Kαι νεκρός ενίκα").
- The marble bust of Zeno of Citium stands at the crossroads near the American Academy. Zeno was born in Kition in 334 BC. After studying philosophy in Athens, he founded the Stoicism school of philosophy.
- The Armenian Genocide Memorial stands on Athenon Avenue.

== Landmarks ==
The city's landmarks include the Church of Saint Lazarus, the Catacomb of Phaneromeni Church, Hala Sultan Tekke, the Bekir Pasha Aqueduct, and the Larnaca Castle.

== Economy ==
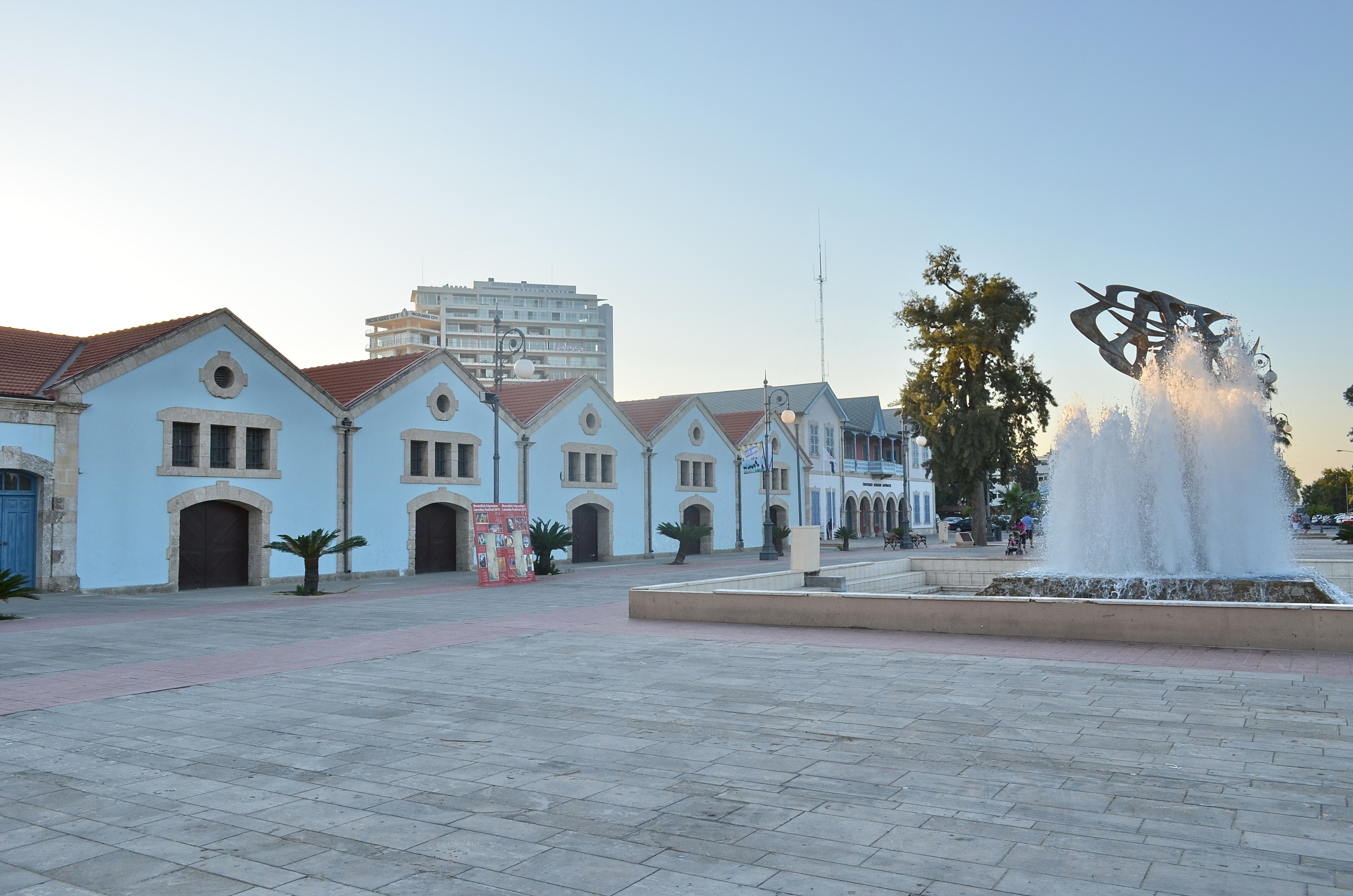
Europe's square with government buildings

Larnaca's economy has been growing since 1975, after the loss of the Port of Famagusta, which handled 80% of general cargo, and the closure of Nicosia International Airport, events which have seen Larnaca's airport and seaport play increasingly important roles in the economy of the island. A €650m upgrade of Larnaca Airport has been completed by Hermes Airports.

The service sector, including tourism, employs three-quarters of Larnaca's labour force. Many travel and tour operators and other travel-related companies have a head office in Larnaca. Moreover, Larnaca is home to several large companies, including: Bank of Cyprus, Hellenic Bank, KPMG, Cyprus airways and Tus airways. Larnaca has the second largest port in Cyprus and has one of the biggest malls in the island, the Metropolis mall.

== Education ==
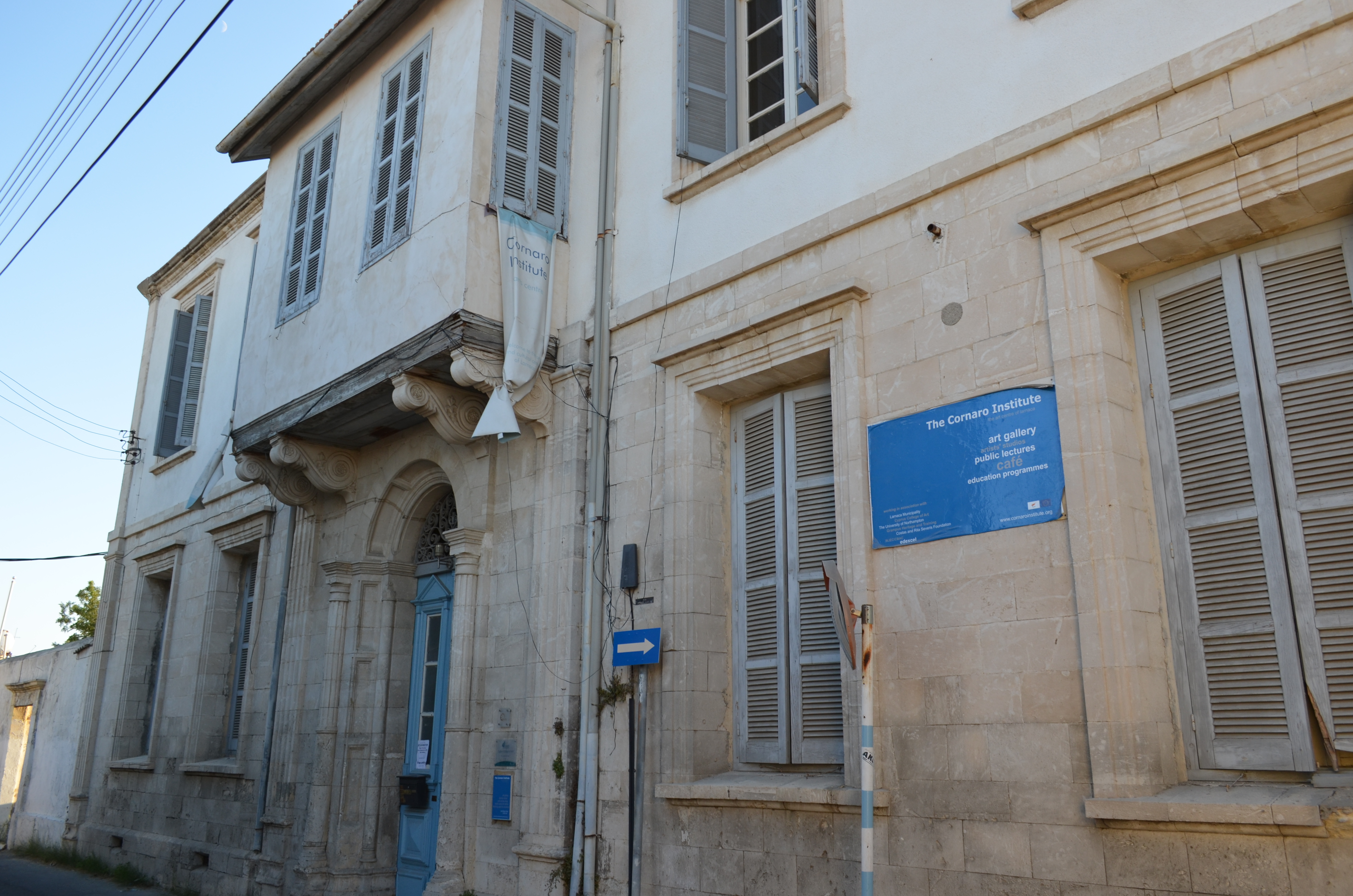
The former Cornaro Institute in Larnaca was an art school and cultural centre prior to its closure by the municipality in 2017

There are over a hundred educational institutions in the city, including the American Academy, Larnaca Nareg Armenian school and the Alexander College. Moreover Larnaca has the American university and the UCLAN Cyprus university.

== Culture ==
=== Arts ===
Larnaca has a theatre and an art gallery, which are operated by the municipality. The Cornaro Institute was a cultural centre founded by the celebrated Cypriot artist Stass Paraskos in the Old Town in 2007, which staged contemporary art exhibitions and other cultural events, prior to its closure by Larnaca Municipality in 2017.

=== Music ===
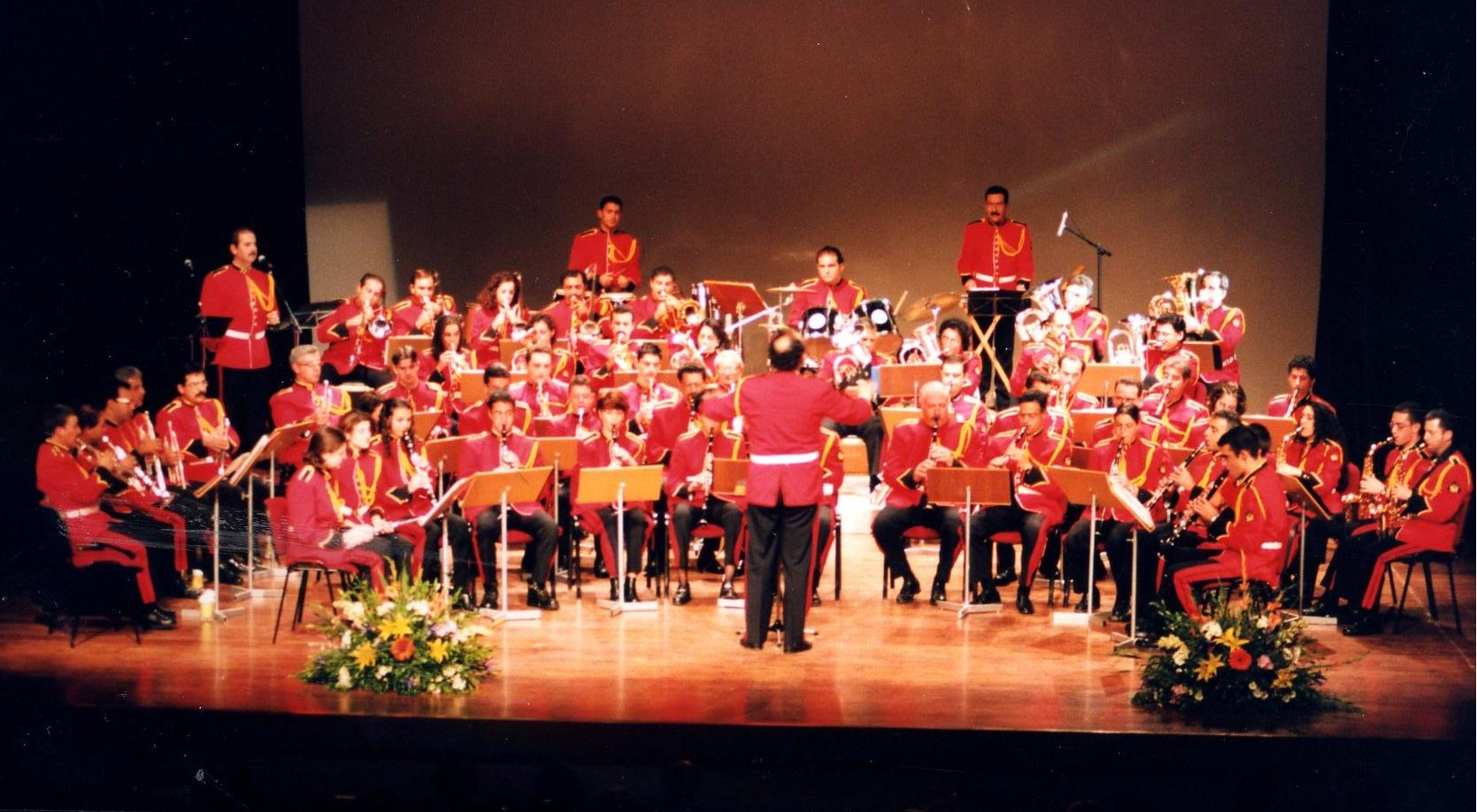
The Municipal Wind Orchestra

Local institutions include the Municipal Wind Orchestra.

=== Sport ===
Local teams include (football:) AEK Larnaca FC and ALKI Larnaca FC. Due to the Turkish occupation of Famagusta, the two teams of Famagusta, Anorthosis and Nea Salamina, are located here.

Local sports arenas include AEK Arena - Georgios Karapatakis, GSZ Stadium, Antonis Papadopoulos Stadium and Ammochostos Stadium.

International competitions held in the city, include the Larnaka International Marathon since 2017, the Shooting Shotgun European Championships in 2012, the FIVB Beach Volleyball SWATCH Youth World Championship in 2012, the European Under-19 Football Championship final in 1998 and the European Under-17 Football Championship final in 1992.

Larnaca attracts windsurfers from around the world, especially in autumn. Mackenzie Beach hosts a windsurfing centre together with an extreme sports centre.

=== Museums ===
Museums found in Larnaca include the Larnaca District Archaeological Museum, Pierides Museum, Agios Lazaros Byzantine Museum, Kallinikeio Municipal Museum of Athienou, Larnaca Medieval Museum, Larnaca Municipal Museum of Natural History, Larnaca Municipal Historical Archives - Museum of Larnaca, Folklore Museum 'Kostas Kaimakliotis' - Aradippou, Theasis Museum, Kyriazis Medical Museum and Museum of Michel Platini.

== Cuisine and seafood ==
The beaches of Larnaca are lined with nearly identical seafood restaurants catering to tourists. Although there are many continental and international restaurants in Larnaca, visitors do not miss out on indulging in the local food. Many of the staple dishes involve beans, such as fasolaki (French beans cooked in red wine with lamb), and louvi me lahana (black-eyed peas with chard).

Some of the standard appetizers are potato salad, kohlrabi salad, and hot grilled black olives. The next course may include Cyprus village sausage and sheftalia, dolmades and keftedes, kolokassi in tomato sauce, and several aubergine-based dishes. Baked or grilled lamb (souvla) usually appears somewhere in the course of dining, as does some kind of fish.

== Neighbourhoods ==
Larnaca's neighbourhoods include Skala, Prodromos, Faneromeni, Drosia, Kamares, Vergina and Agioi Anargyroi.

== Transport ==
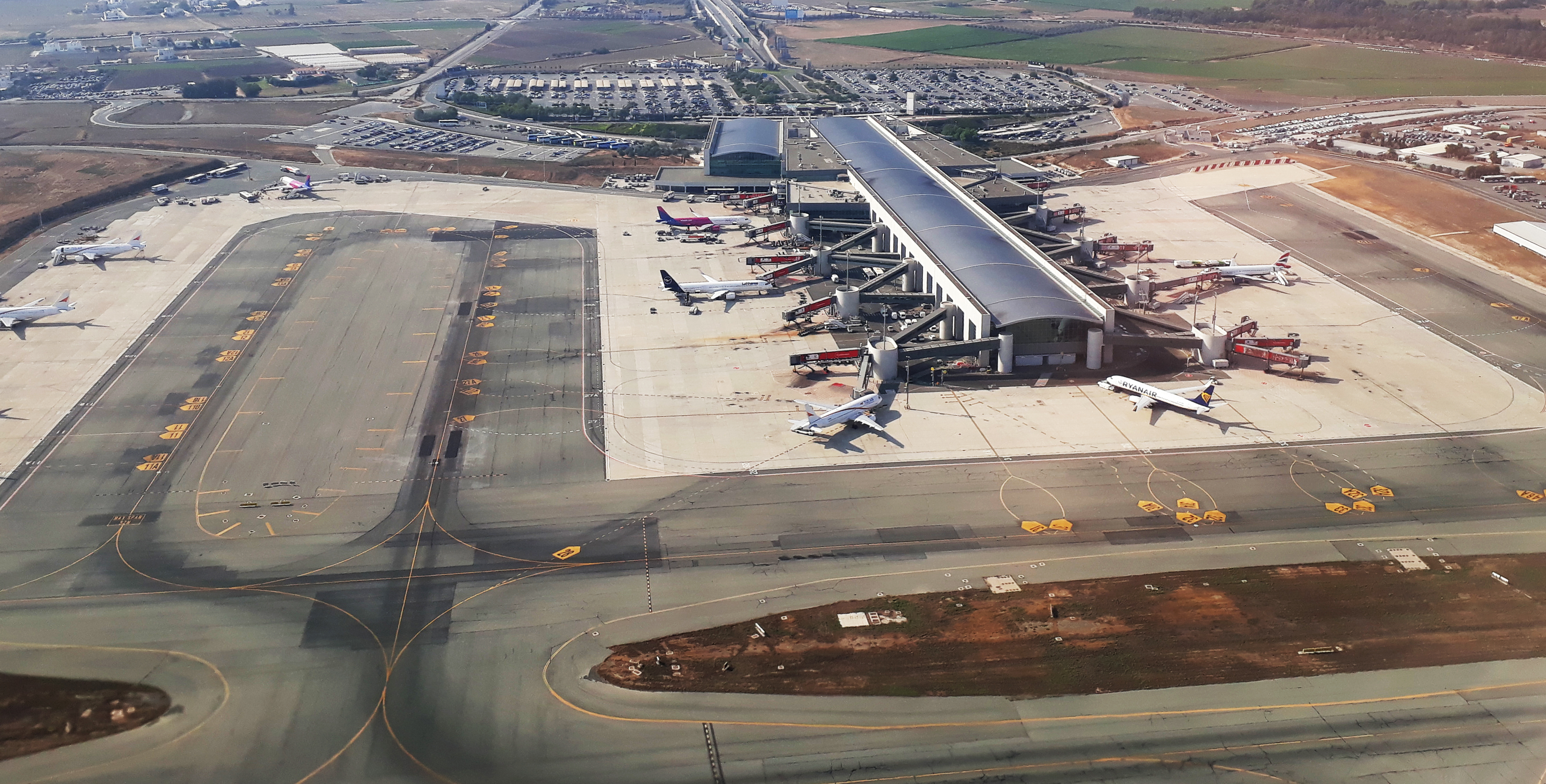
Larnaca International Airport

The city's transport hubs are Larnaca International Airport and Larnaca Port—the Republic's busiest airport and second busiest port.

=== Public transport ===
Public transport in Larnaca is served only by buses. Fares cost 2.40 cash (May 2025). Larnaca has a lot of choices to move only by bus from Larnaca international airport and the Larnaca central station

== International relations ==
=== Twin towns – sister cities ===
Larnaca Municipality is twinned with the following:

- Acapulco, Mexico (since 2011)
- Ajaccio, France (since 1989)
- Bratislava, Slovakia (since 2013)
- Galaxidi, Greece (since 2005)
- Giannitsa, Greece (since 2003)
- Glyfada, Greece (since 1998)
- Ilioupoli, Greece (since 2000)
- Larissa, Greece (since 1990)
- Leros, Greece (since 2000)
- Marrickville, Australia (since 2005)
- Piraeus, Greece (since 1999)
- (Georgia (country)) Poti, Georgia (since 1987)
- Sarandë, Albania (since 1994)
- Szeged, Hungary (since 1993)
- (United States) Tarpon Springs, U.S. (since 2009)
- Tianjin, China (since 2007)
- Tulcea, Romania (since 2003)
- Venice, Italy (since 2010)

=== Consulates and consulates general ===
As of October 2024, Larnaca hosts 2 consulates general and 13 consulates.

- Afghanistan
- Albania
- Bangladesh (consulate general)
- Bosnia and Herzegovina
- El Salvador
- France
- Gambia
- Italy
- Morocco (consulate general)
- Philippines
- Portugal
- Saint Vincent and the Grenadines
- Sri Lanka
- Tunisia
- Uganda

== Notable residents ==
- Zeno of Citium (c. 334 – c. 262 BC), Stoic philosopher
- Apollonios of Kition (1st century BC), physician, nicknamed "the Cypriot Hippocrates"
- Ebubekir Pasha (1670 – 1757/1758), Governor of Larnaca and philanthropist
- Demetrios Pieridis (1811–1895), founder of the Pieridis Museum
- Constantine Leventis (1938-2002), businessman, philanthropist
- Dimitris Lipertis (1866–1937), national poet
- Neoclis Kyriazis (1877–1956), medical doctor and historian
- Mehmet Nazim Adil (1922–2014), leader of the Nakshbandi Sufi order (or Tekke), born in Larnaca
- Kyriacos A. Athanasiou, Cypriot-American academic, entrepreneur, and past president of the Biomedical Engineering Society
- Stass Paraskos, artist
- Mihalis Violaris, singer and composer who helped popularise Cypriot music in Greece
- Giorgos Theofanous, composer
- Anna Vissi, singer
- Loucas Yiorkas, singer, The X Factor winner in 2009
- Ada Nicodemou, actress
- Garo Yepremian, Armenian-Cypriot former NFL placekicker, played as a member of the 1972 Miami Dolphins, to date the only team in NFL history to finish with a perfect record
- Chrystalleni Trikomiti, Commonwealth Games gold-medalist rhythmic gymnast
- Martino Tirimo, Cypriot classical pianist
- Tio Ellinas, Cypriot racing driver

== Gallery ==
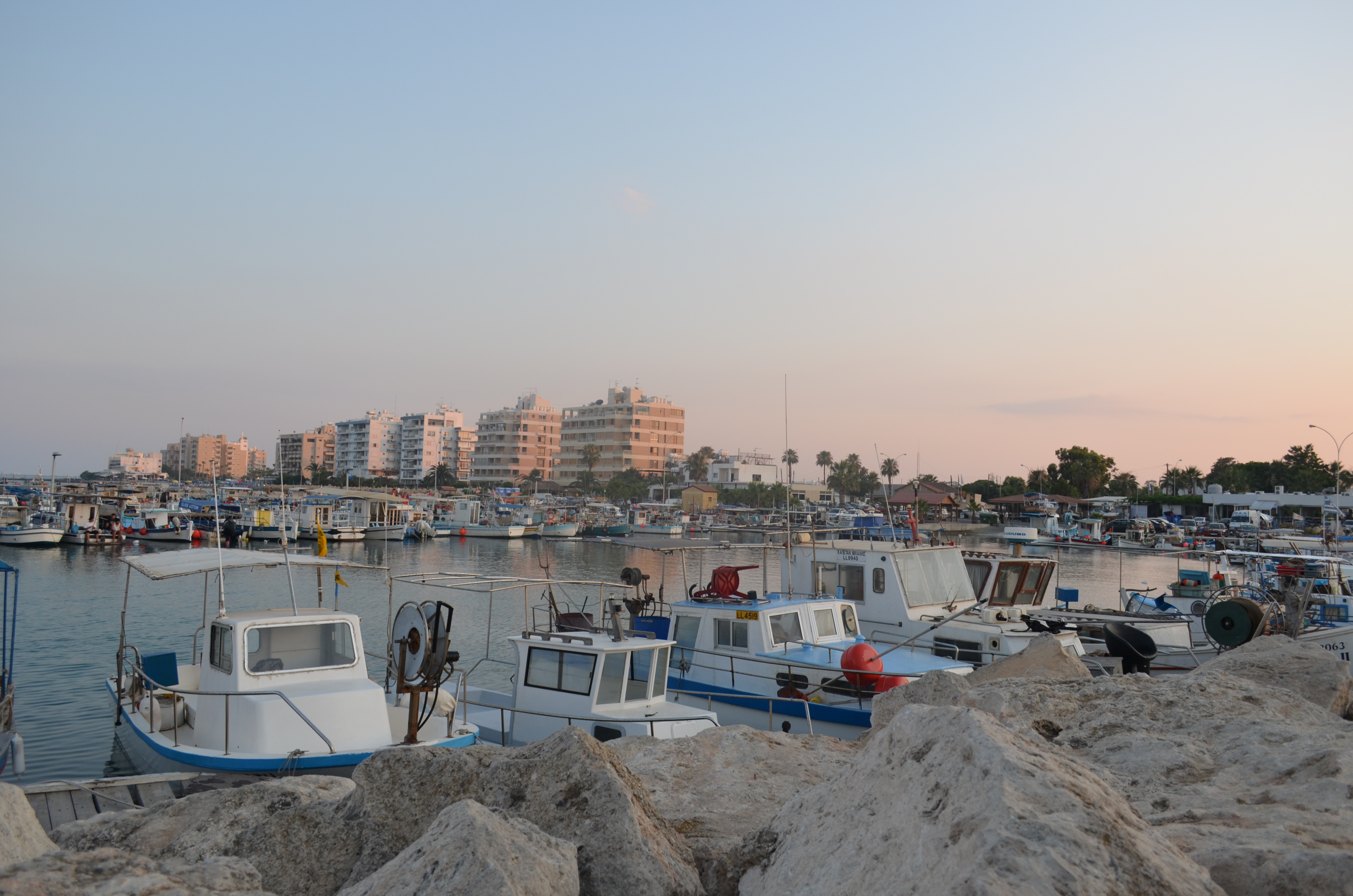
Fishing port "Psarolimano"

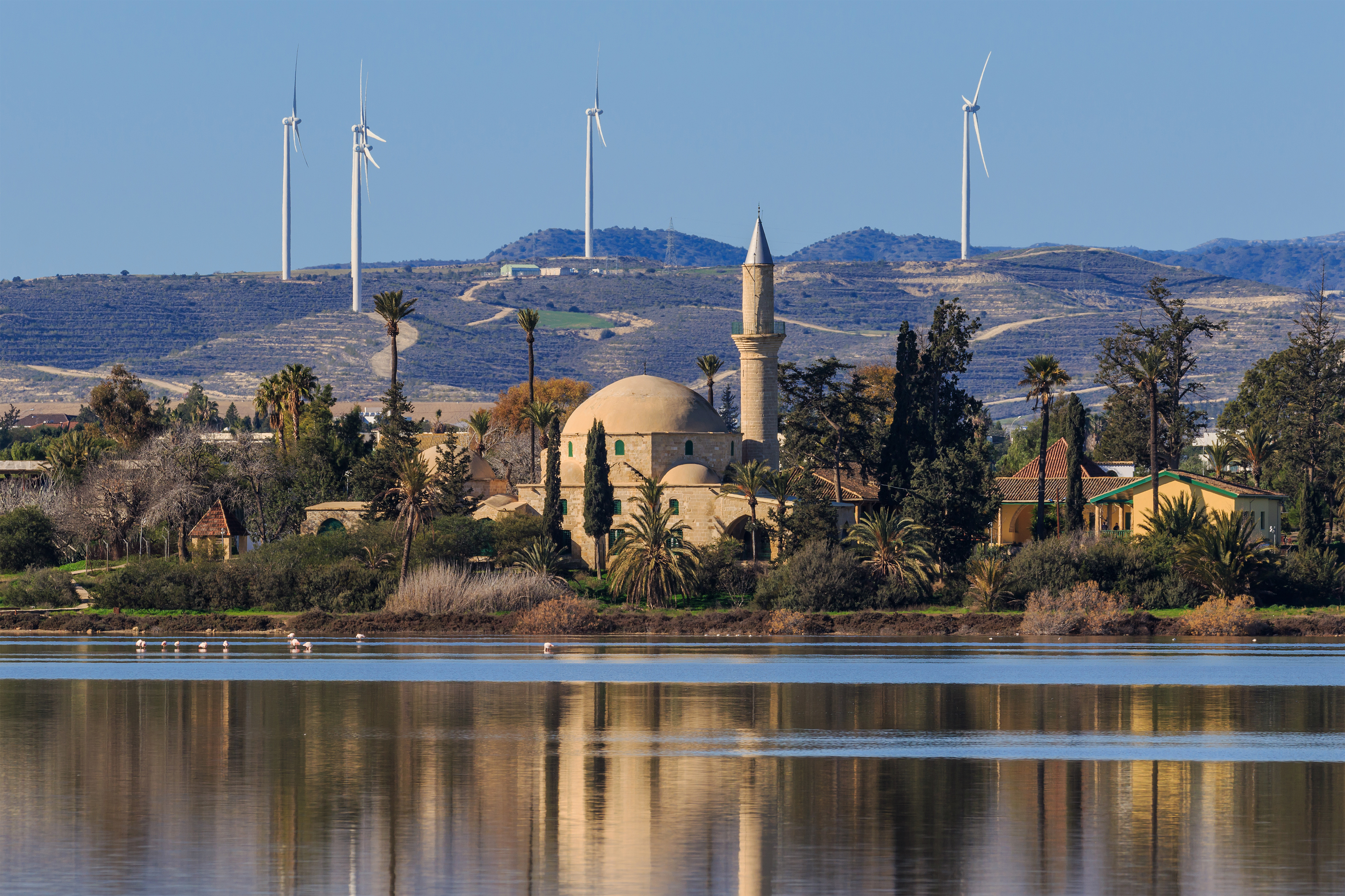
Hala Sultan Tekke

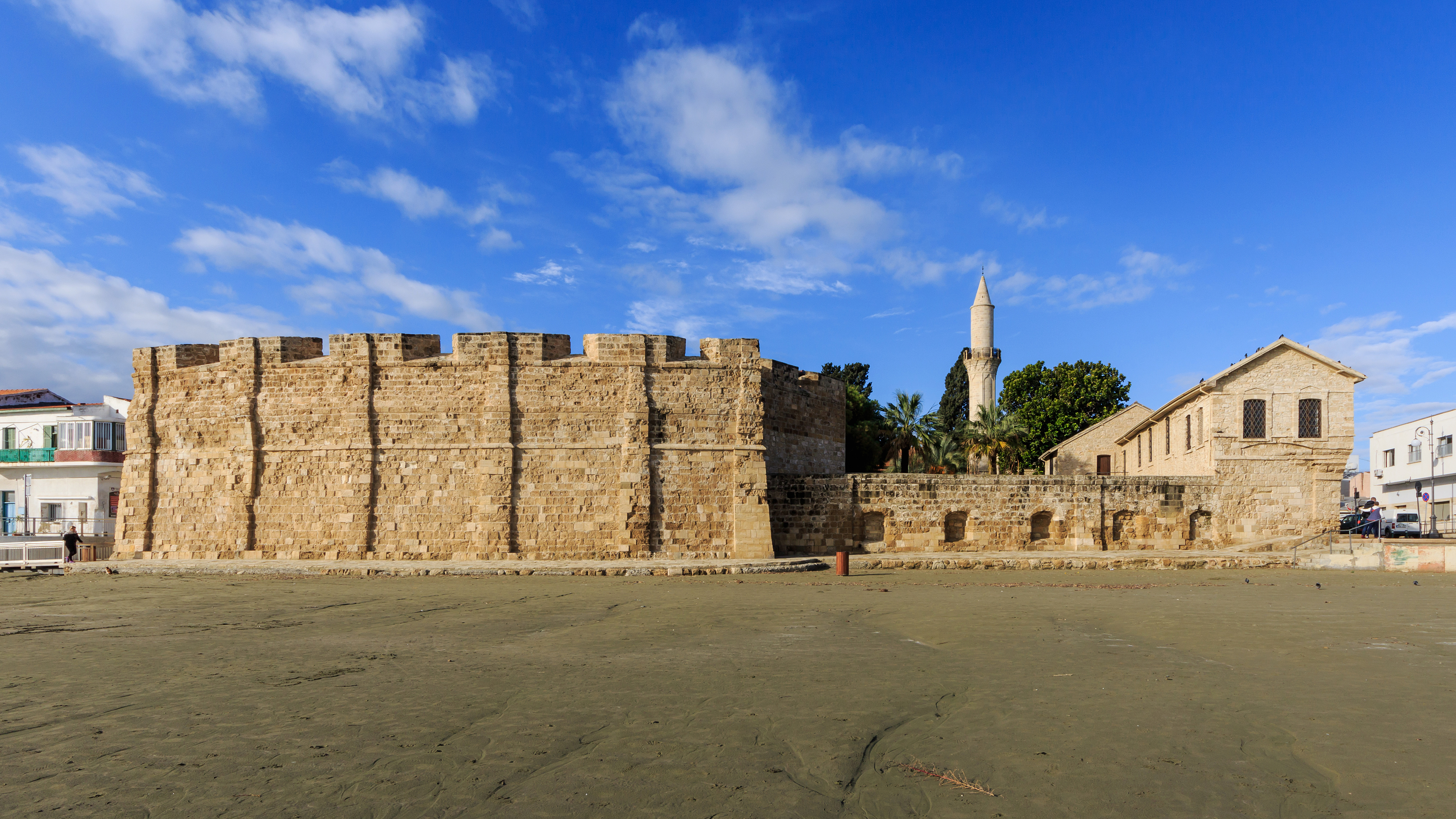
Castle exterior

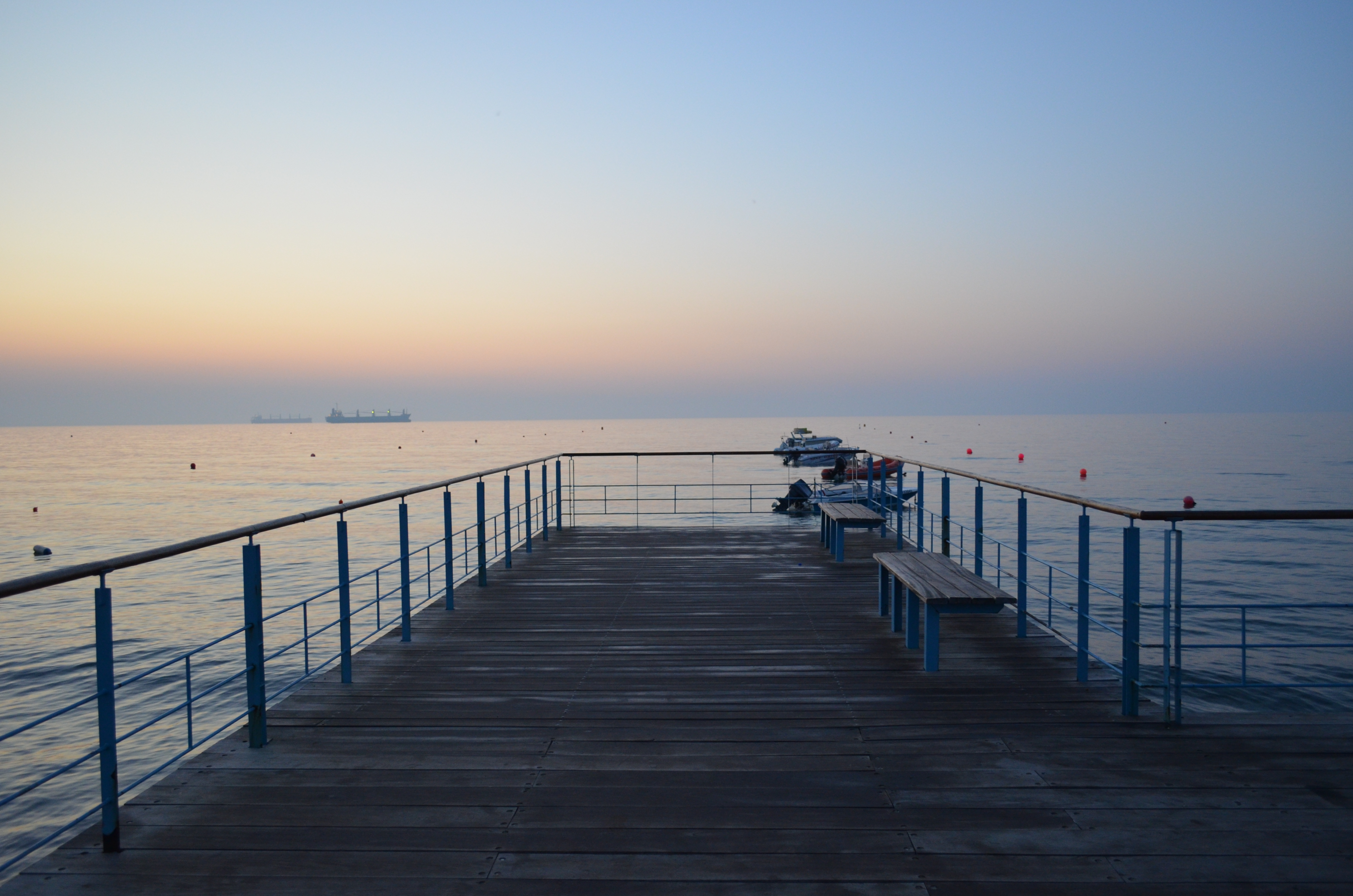
Castle square pier

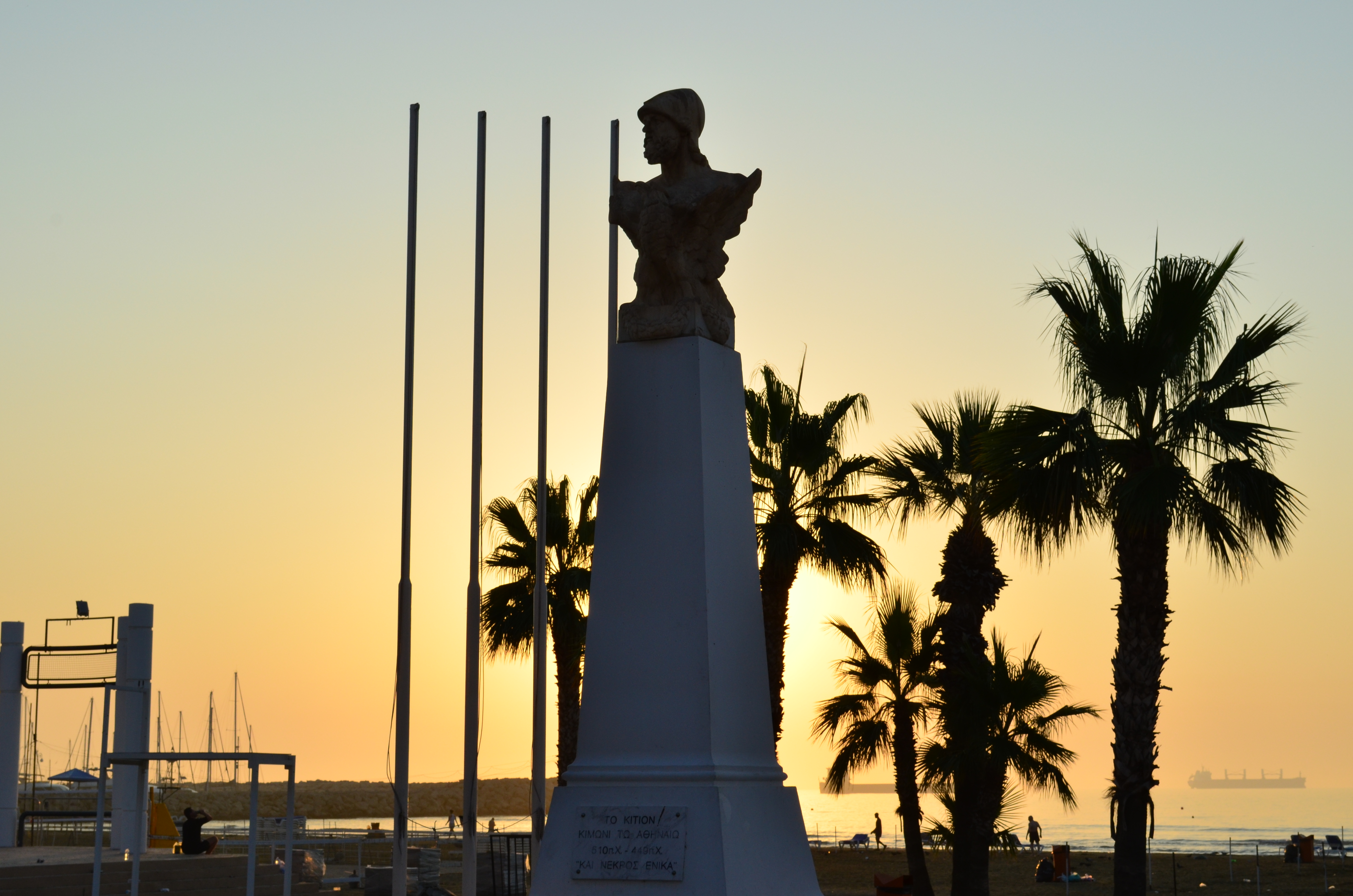
Kimon statue

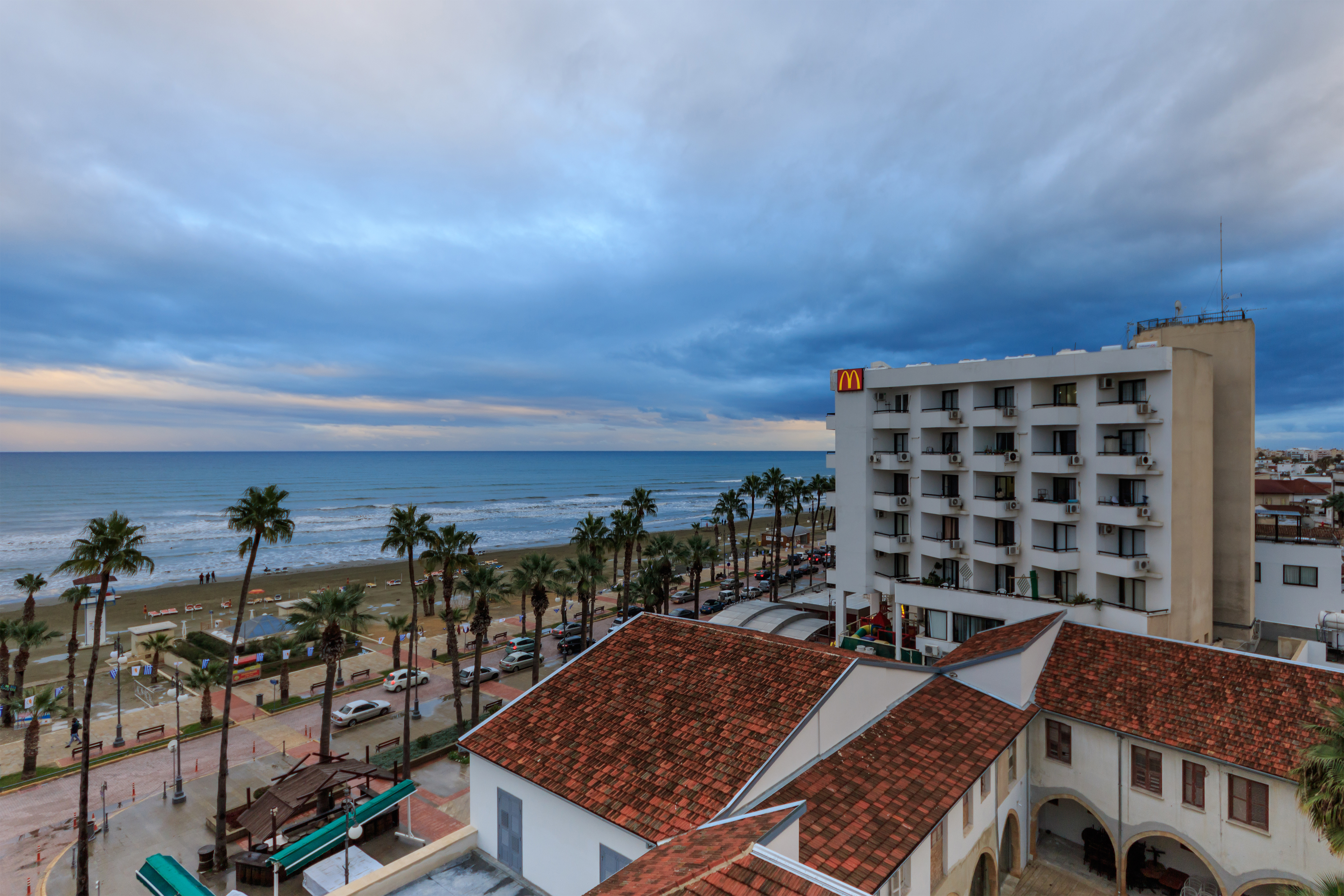
Finikoudes Avenue

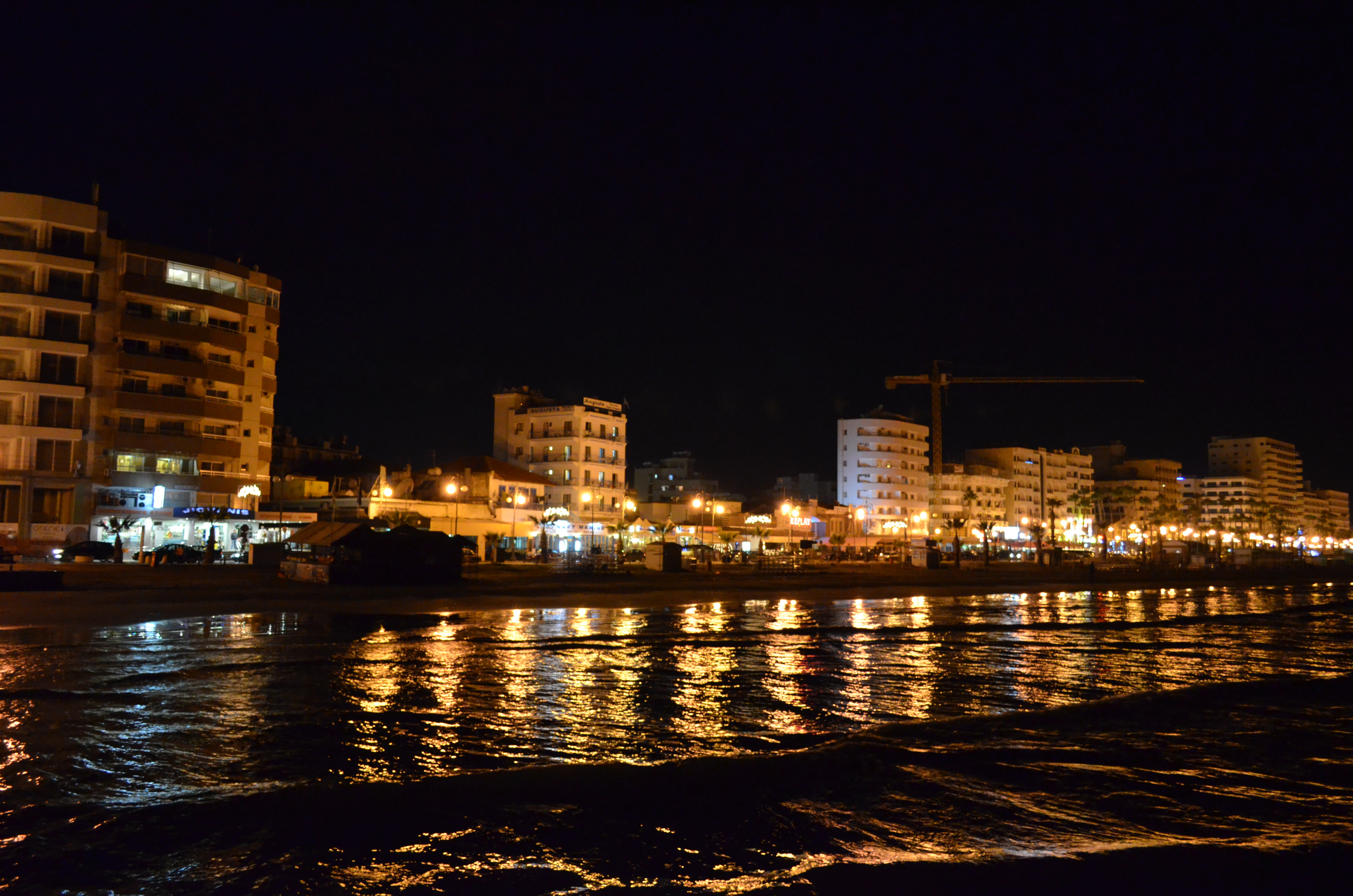
View of Larnaca from sea

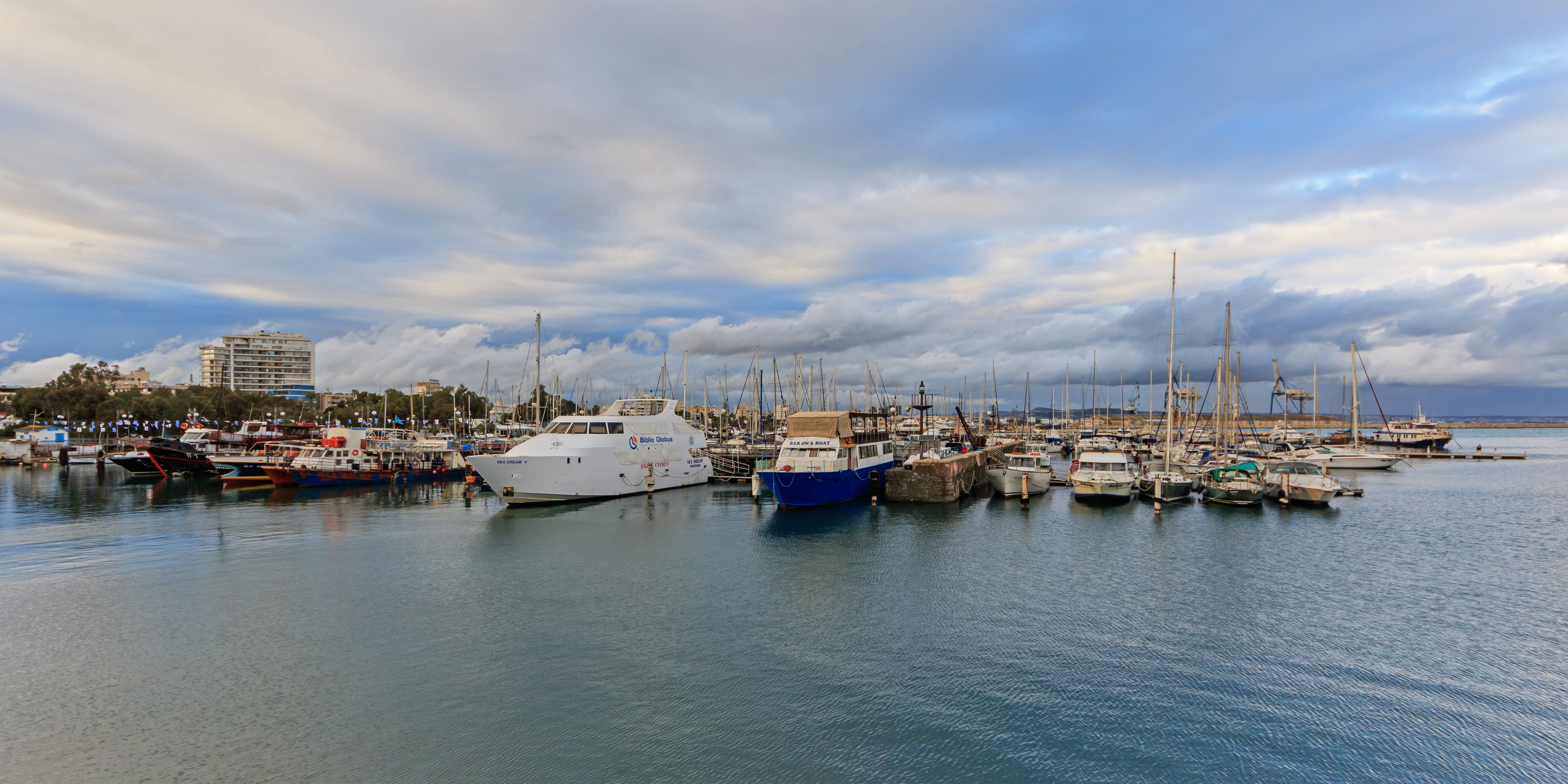
Larnaca marina

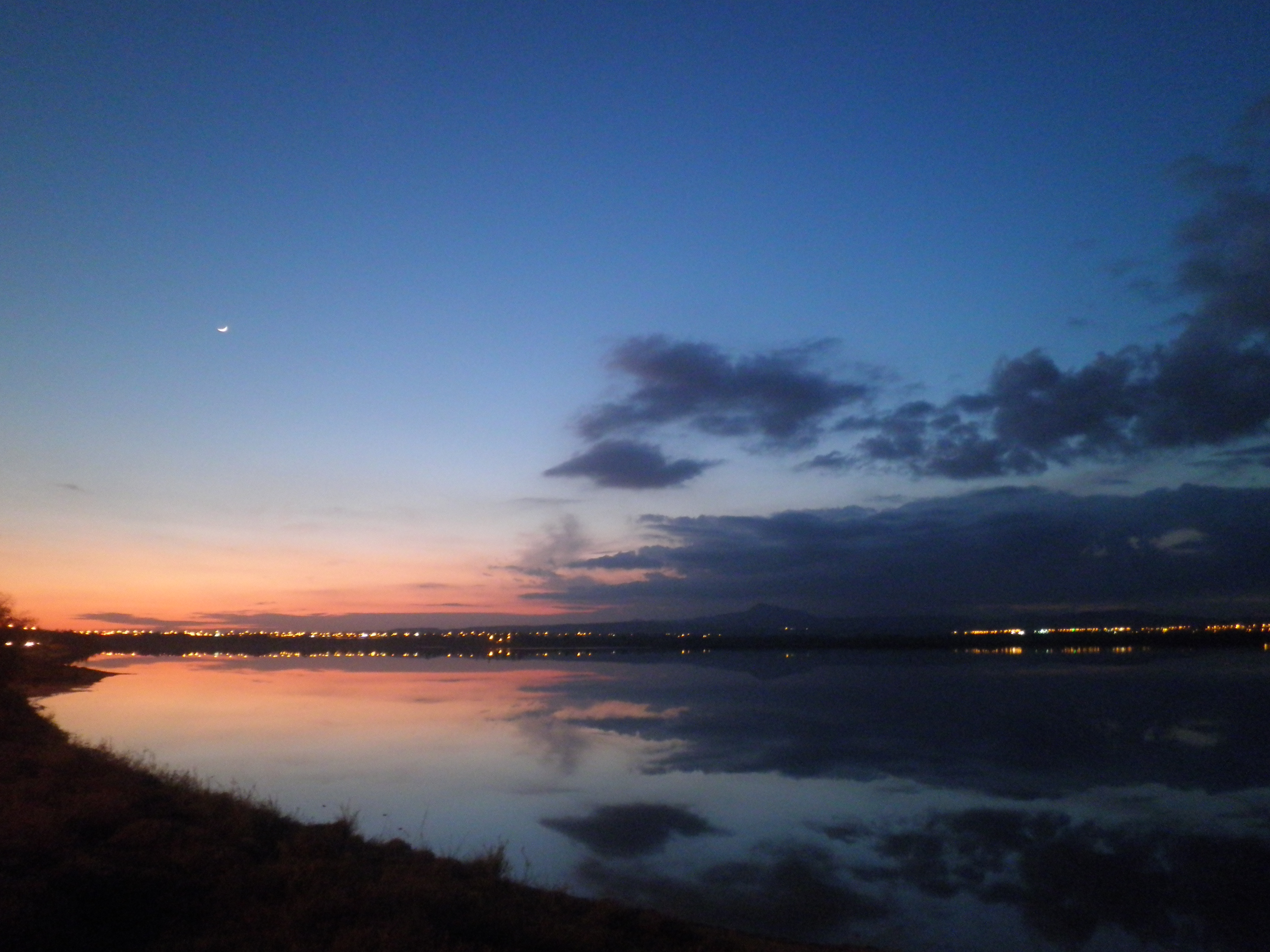
Larnaca Salt Lake

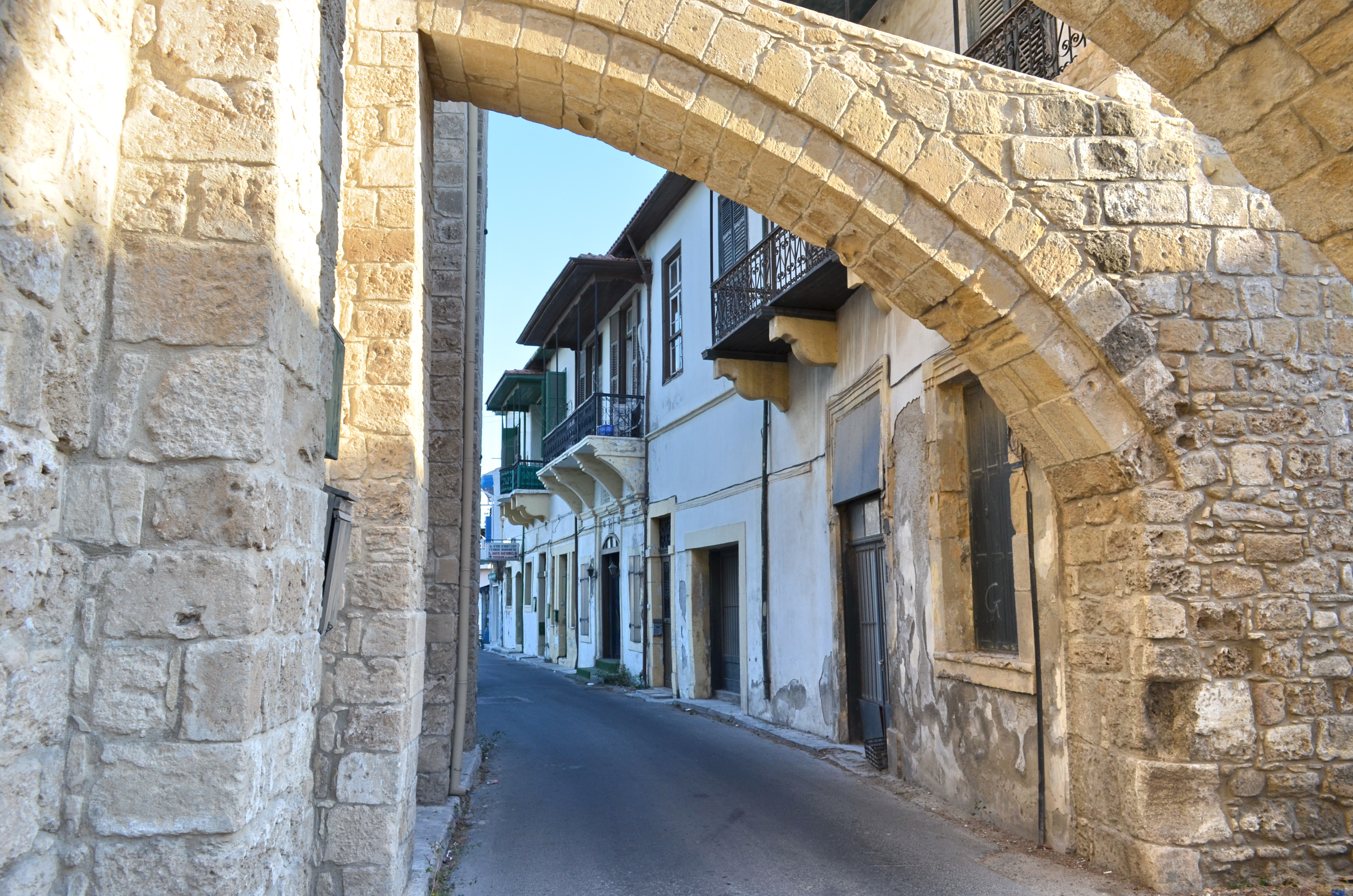
Aspect of the old town

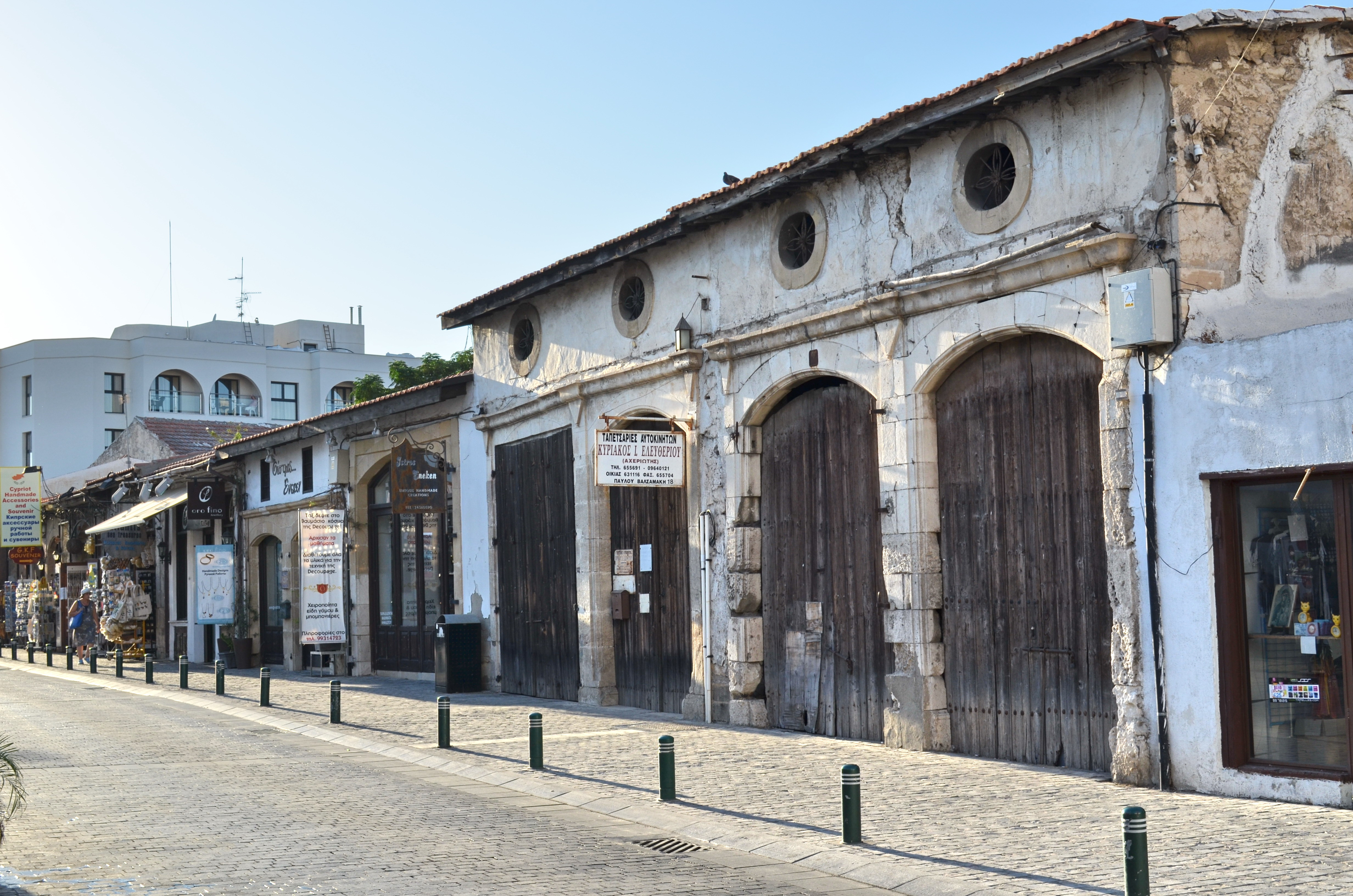
Souvenir shops

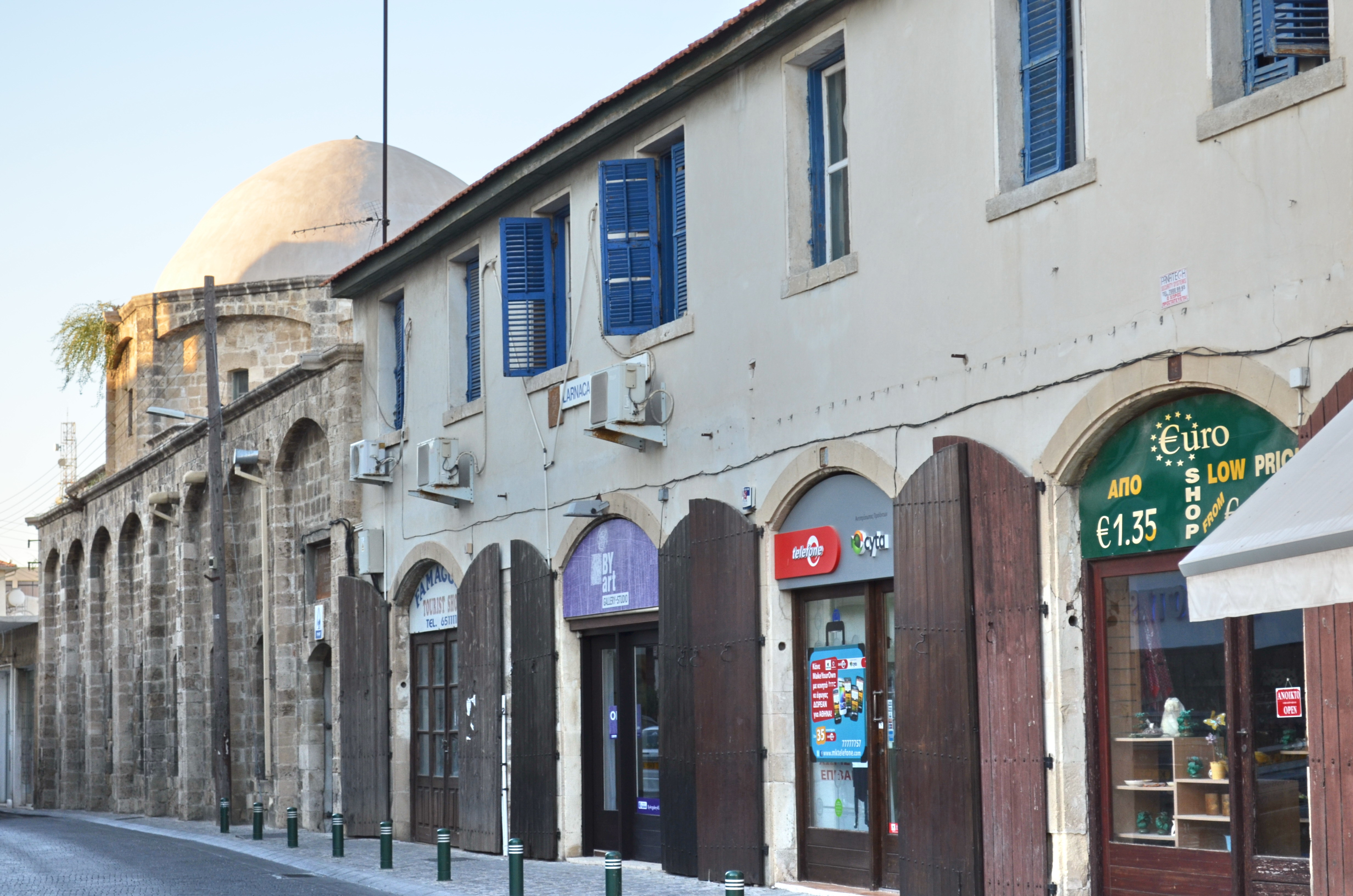
Old town

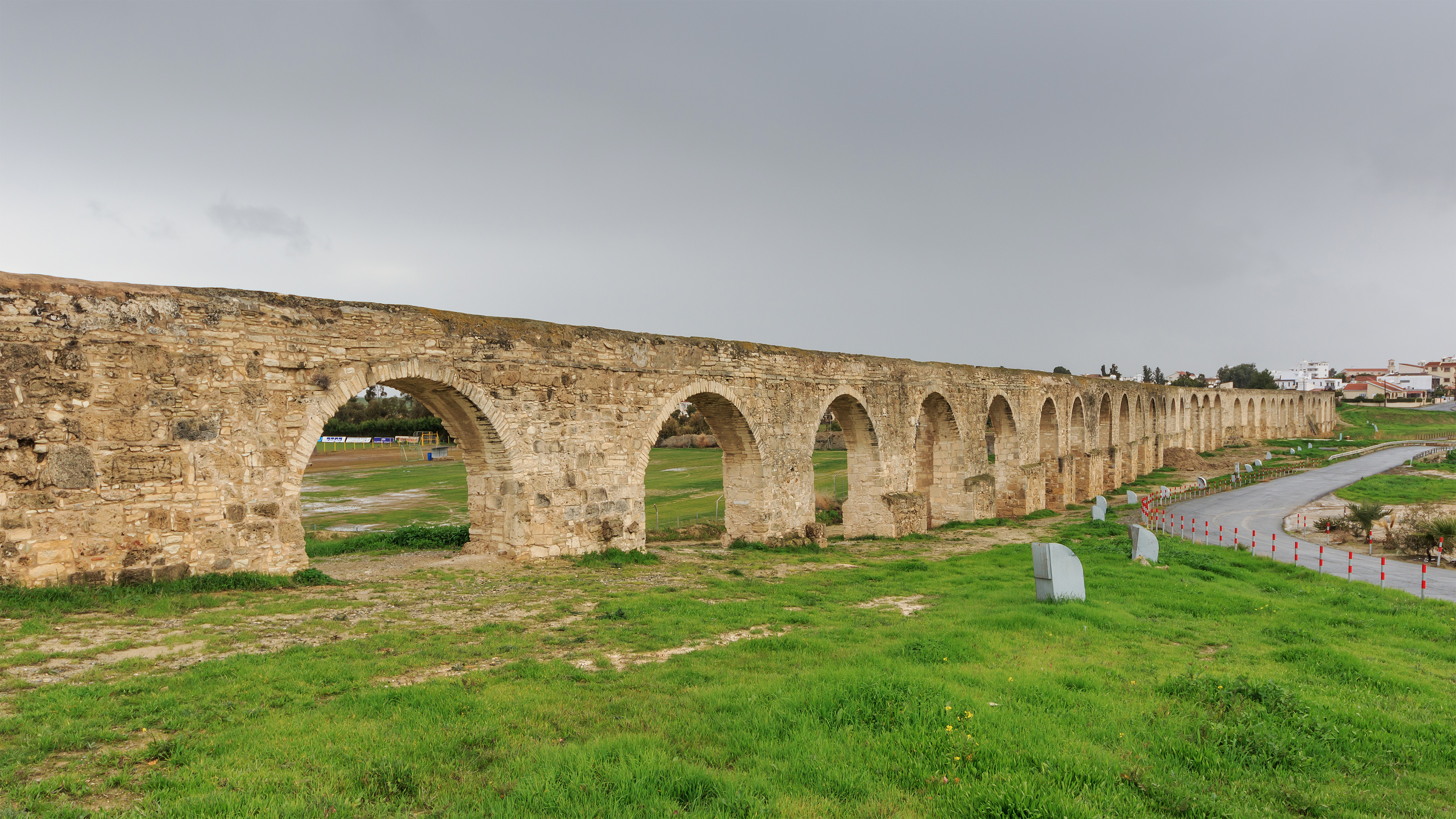
Old aqueduct "Kamares"

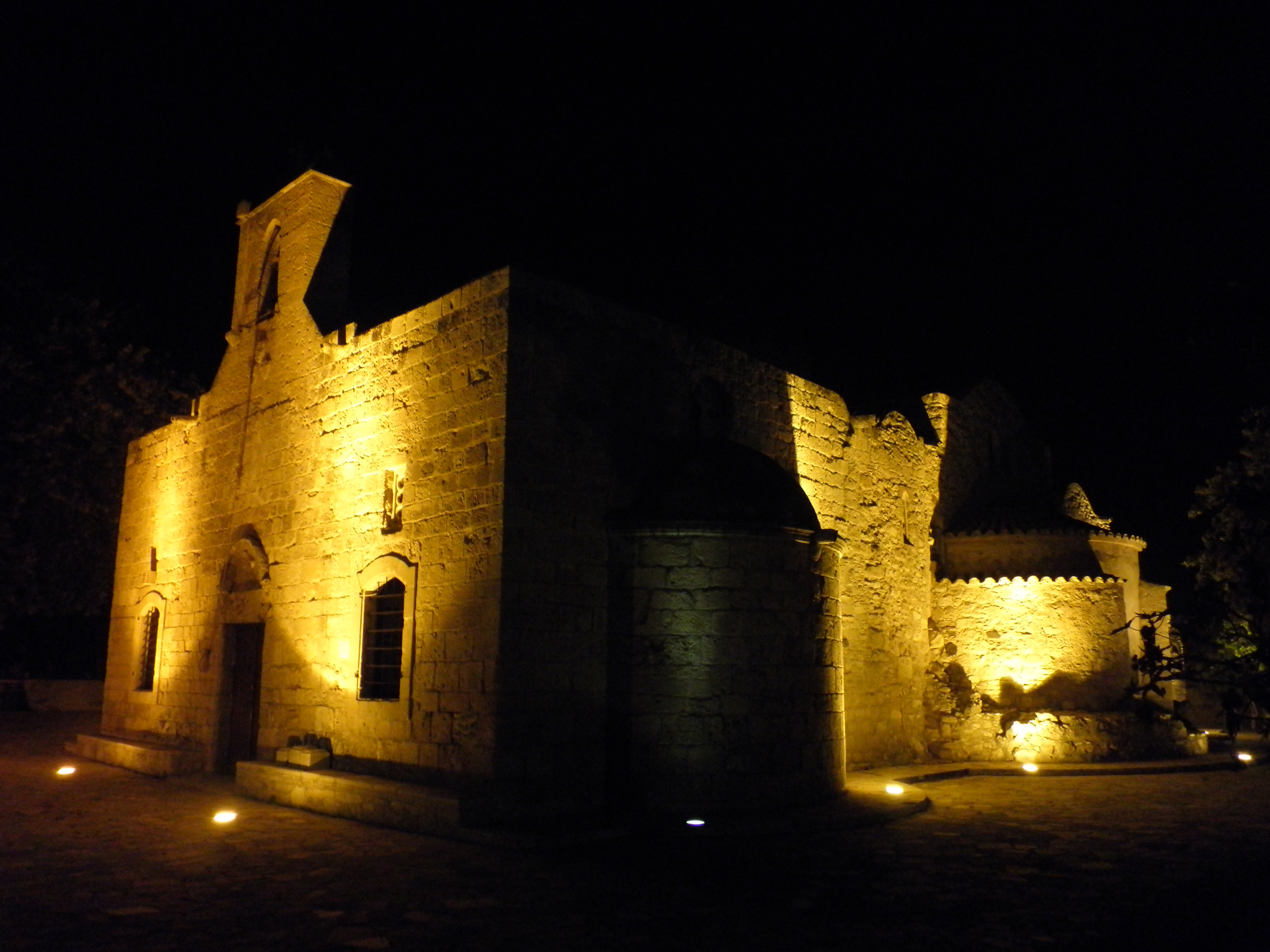
Angeloktisti medieval church

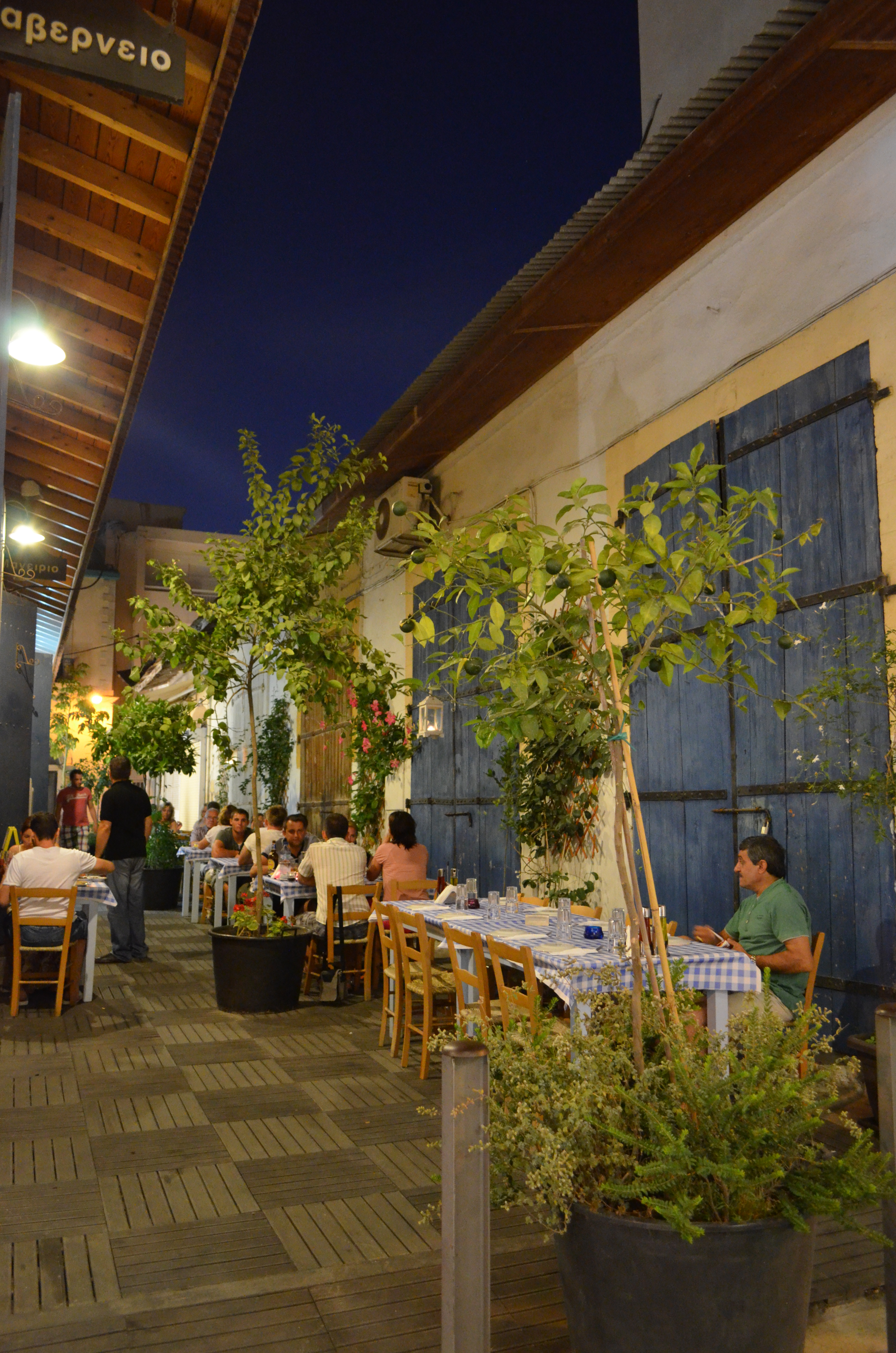
Street in town center

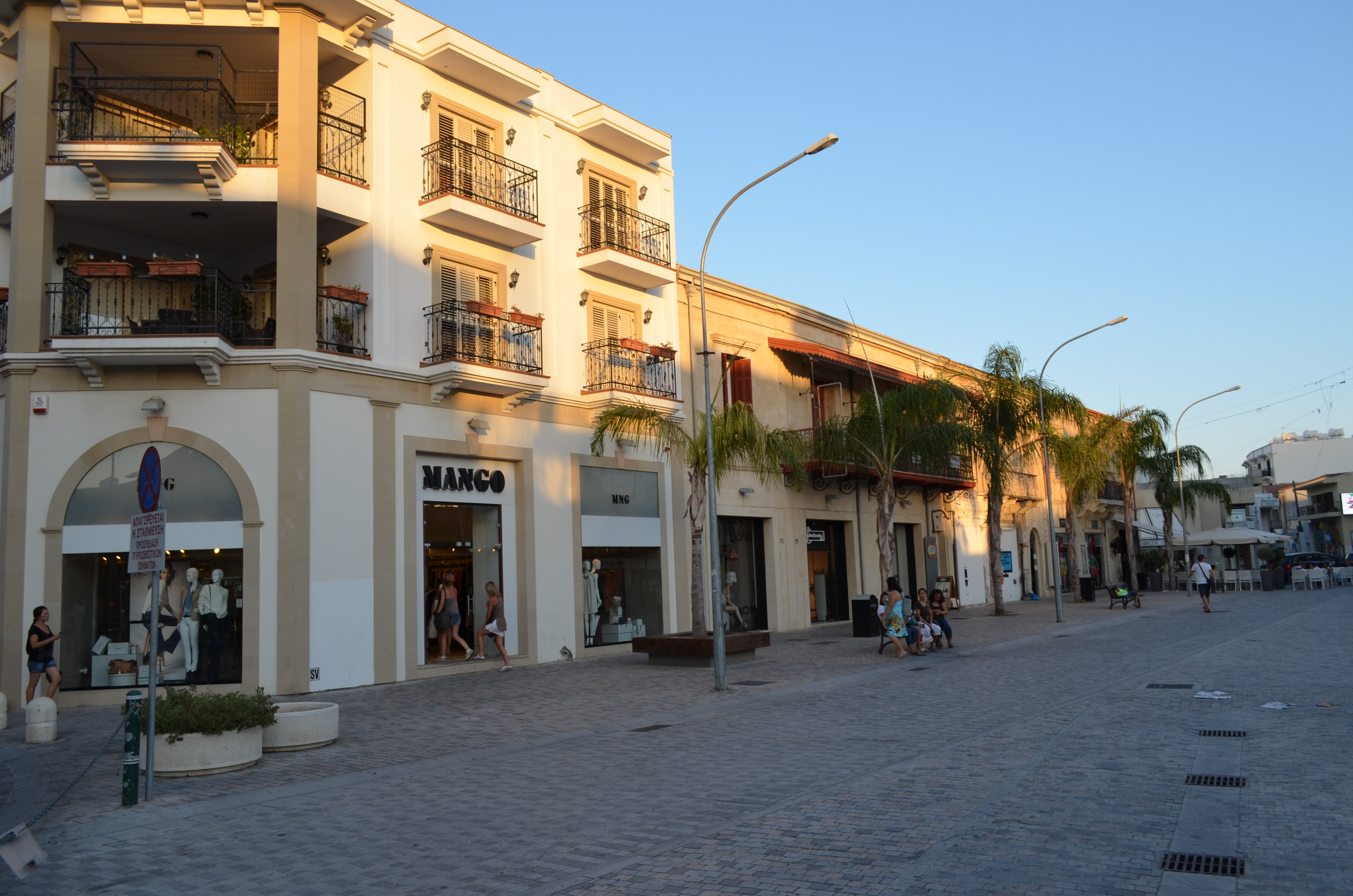
Ermou square

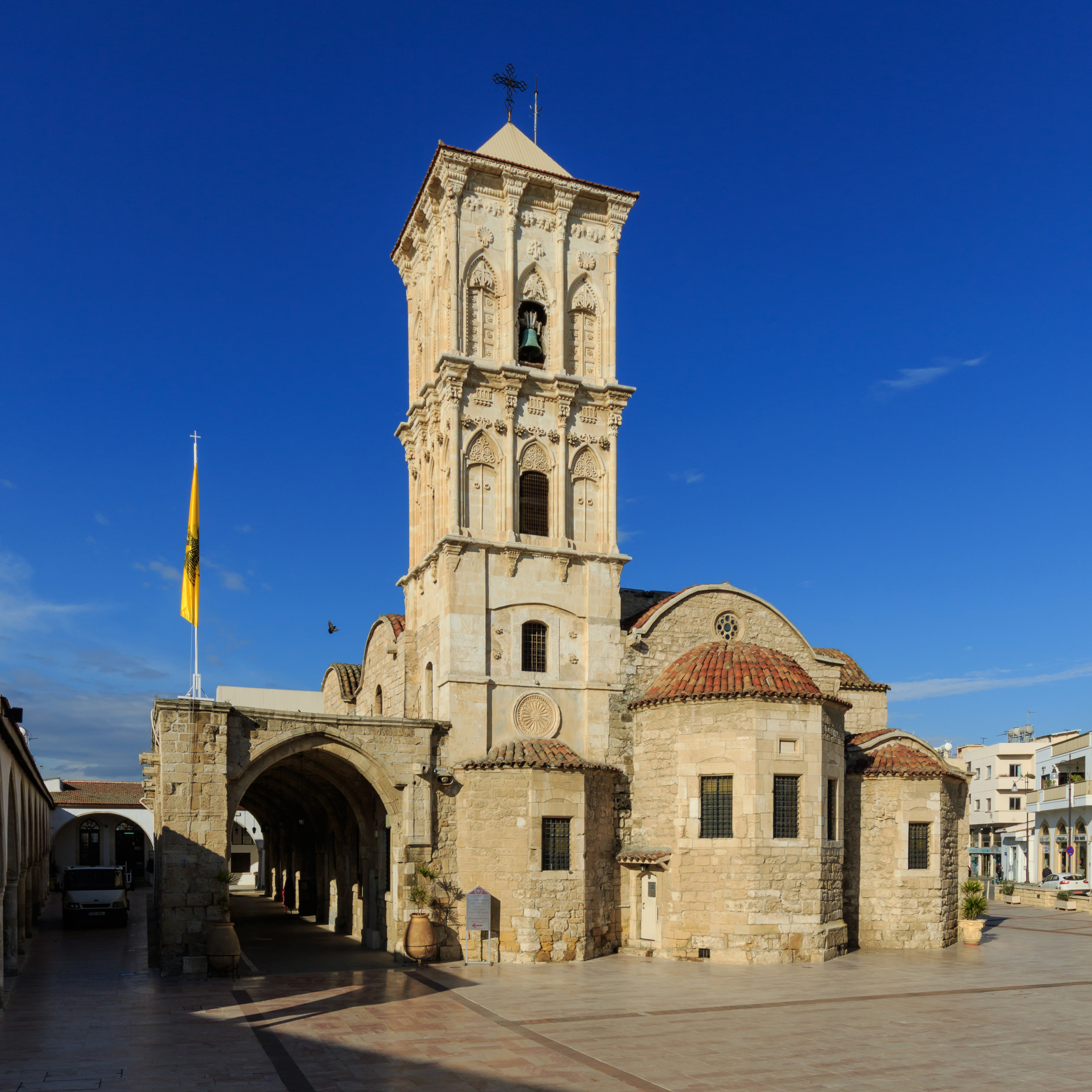
Saint Lazarus

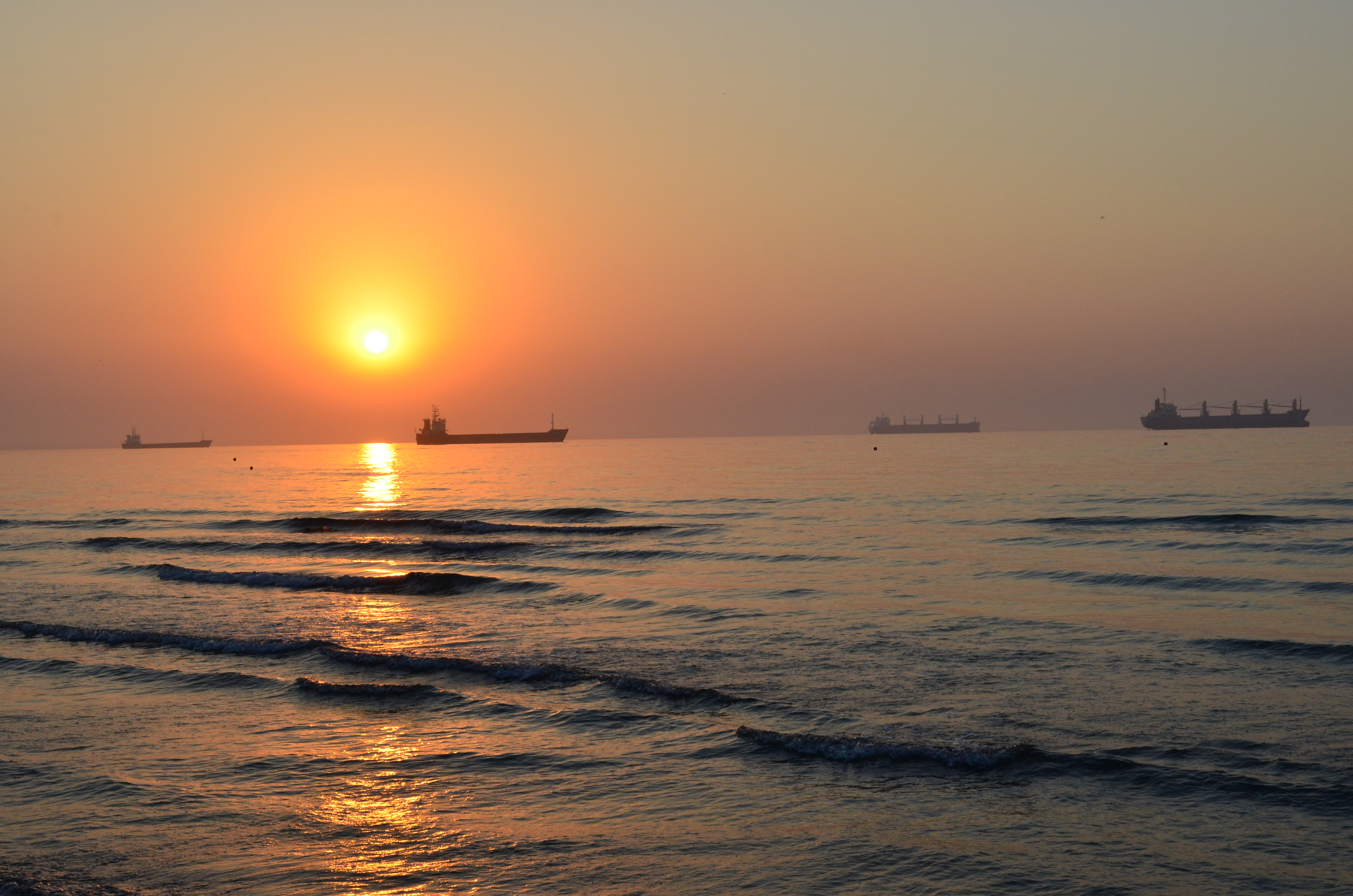
Vessels near Larnaca port

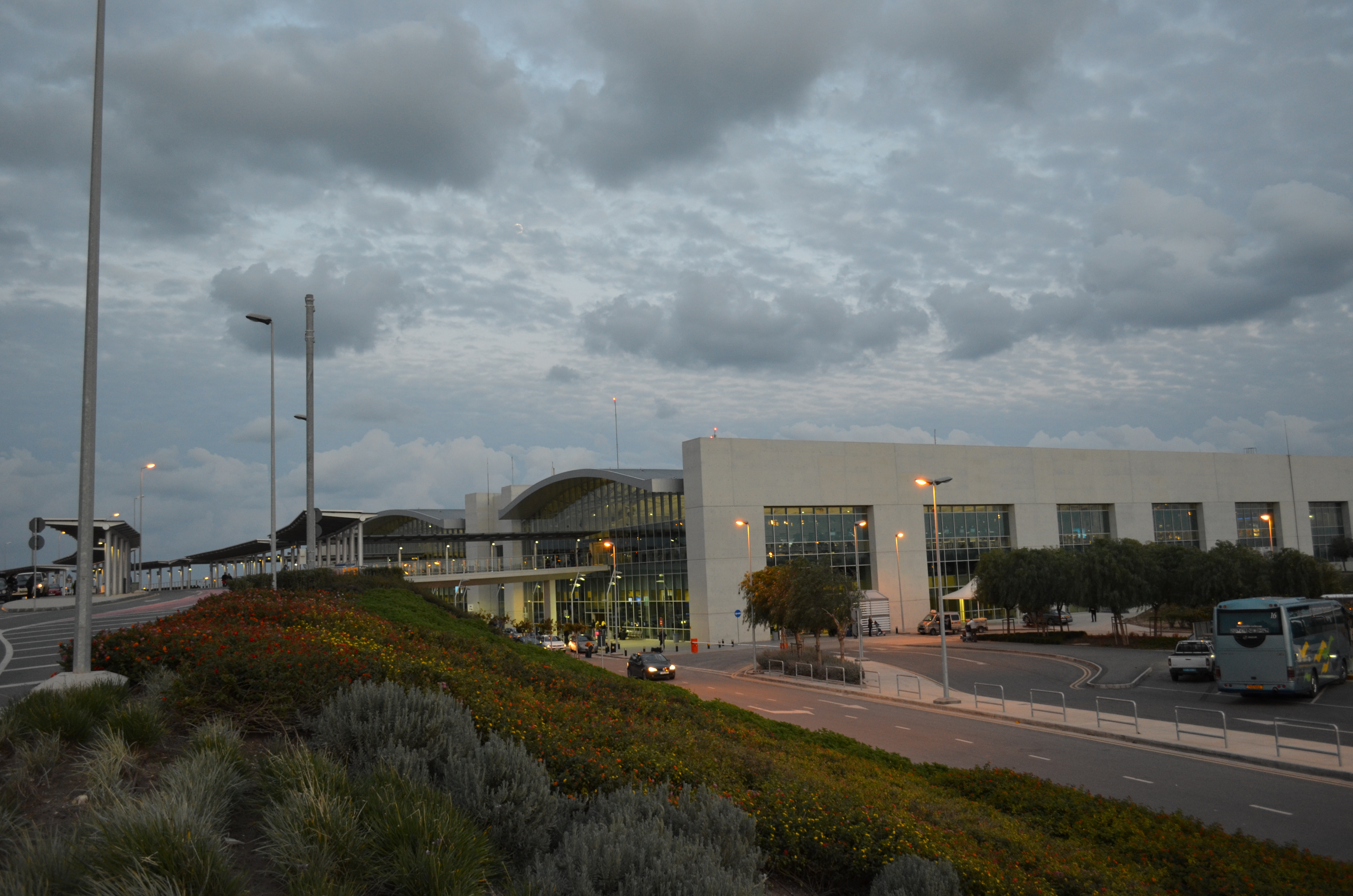
Larnaca International Airport

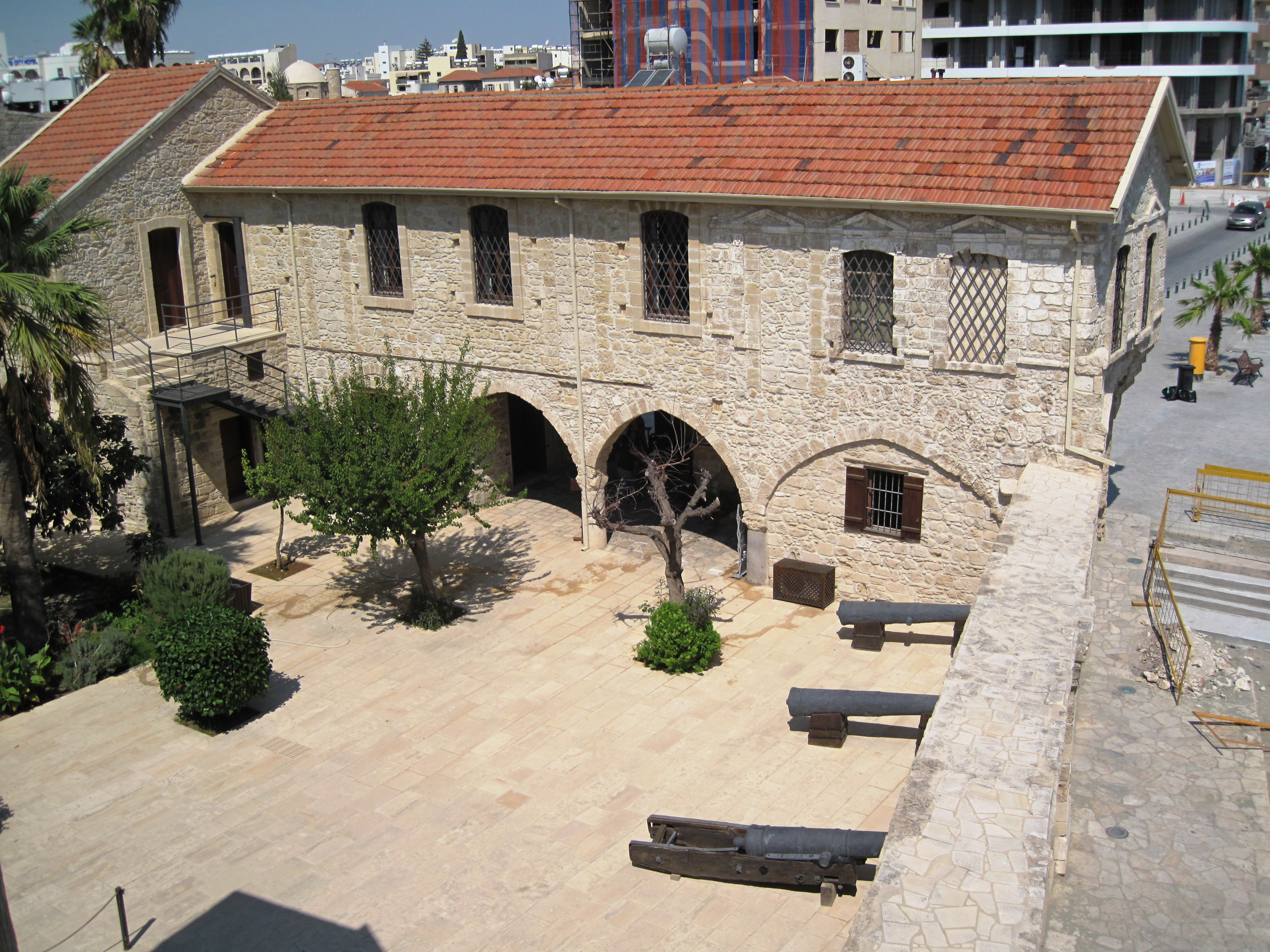
Larnaca Castle interior

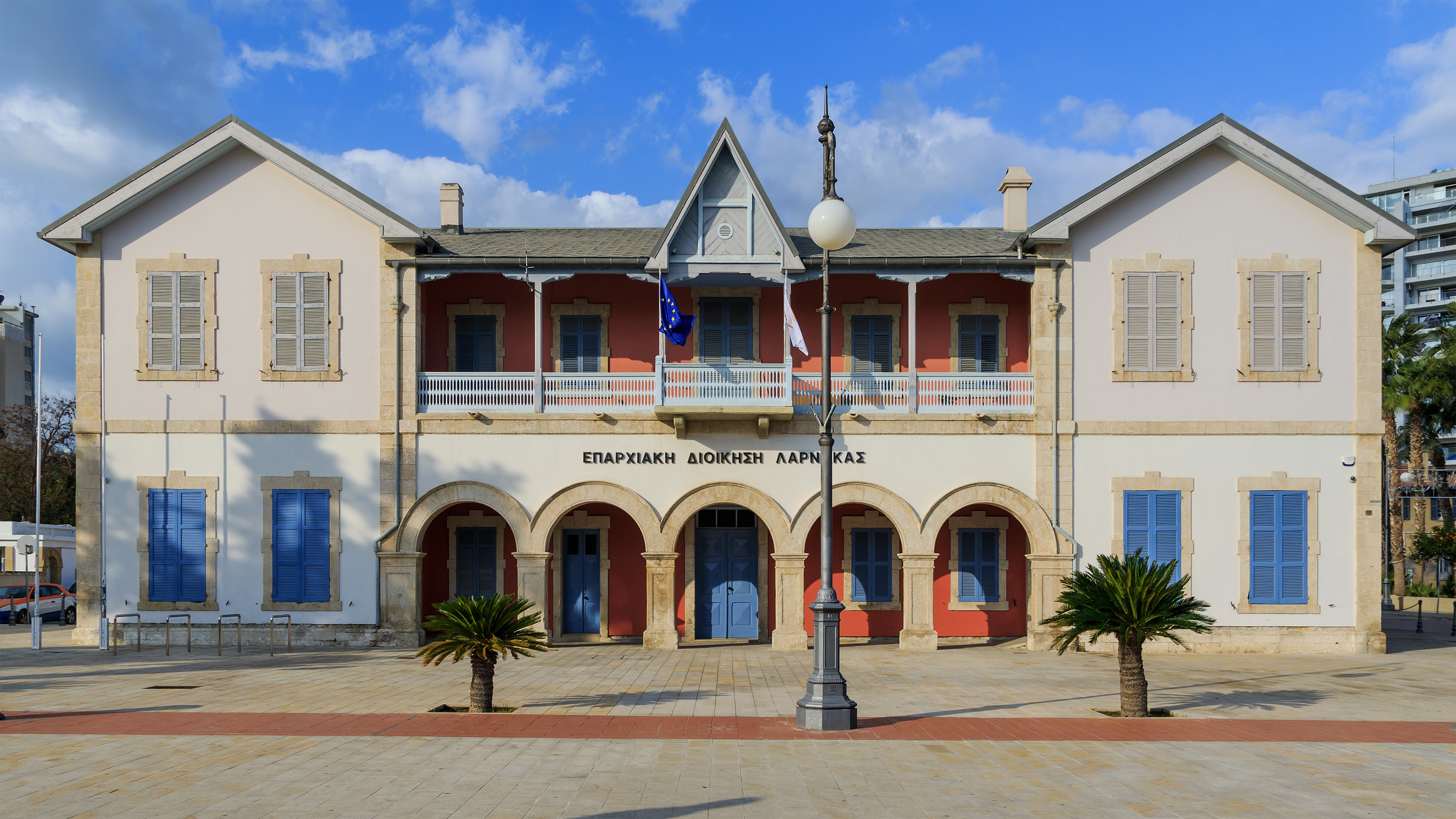
Building of District Administration Larnaca

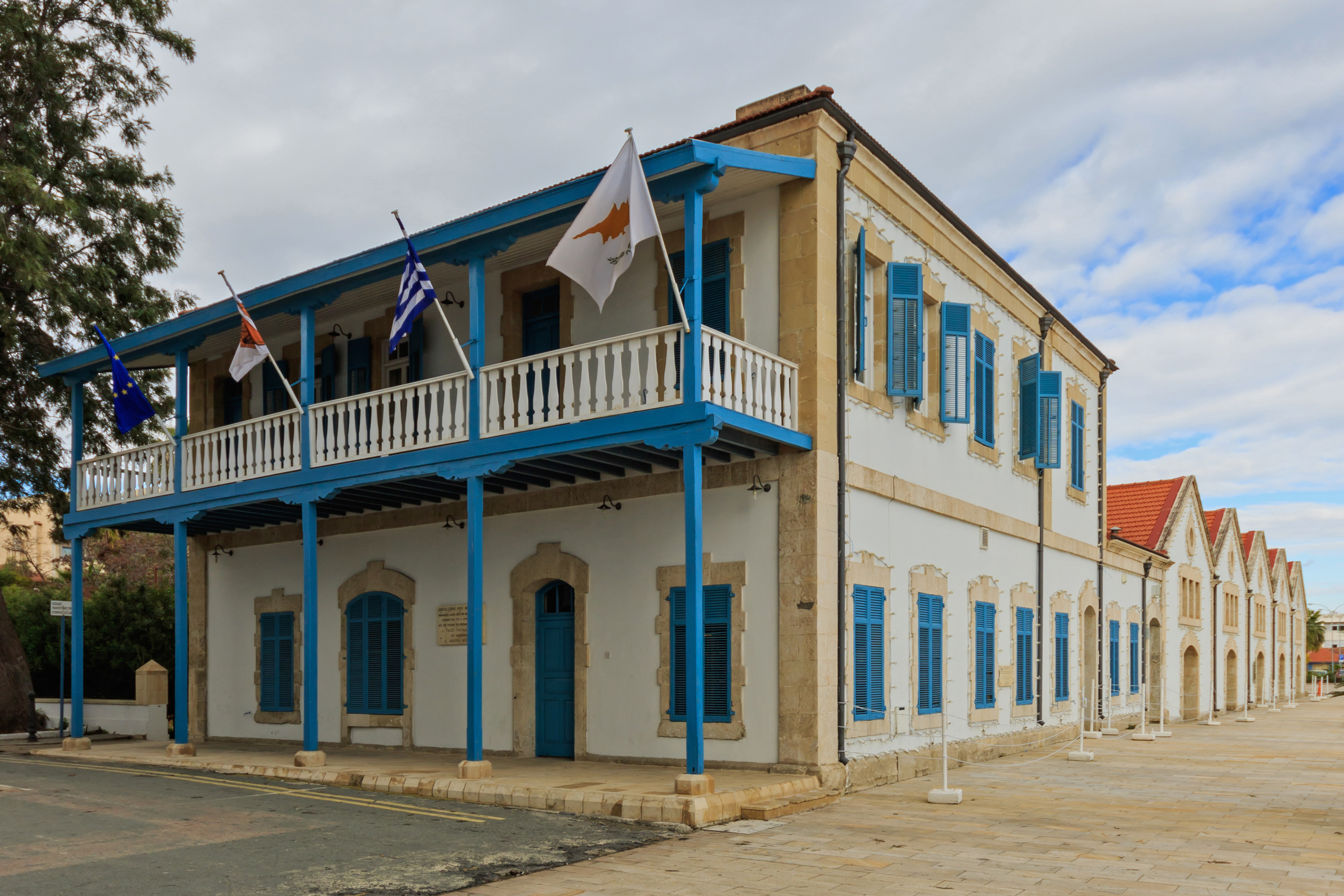
Europe square

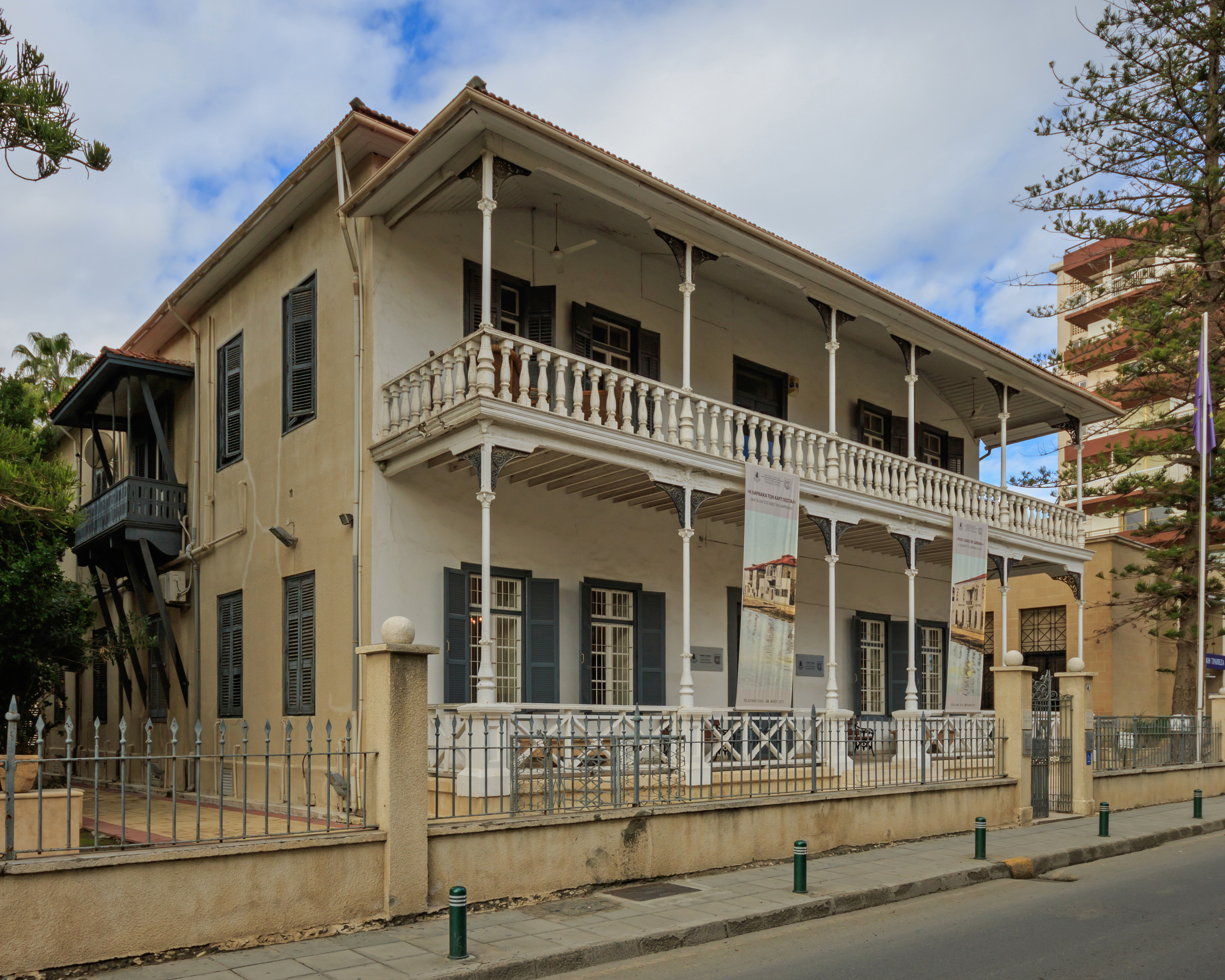
Pierides Museum

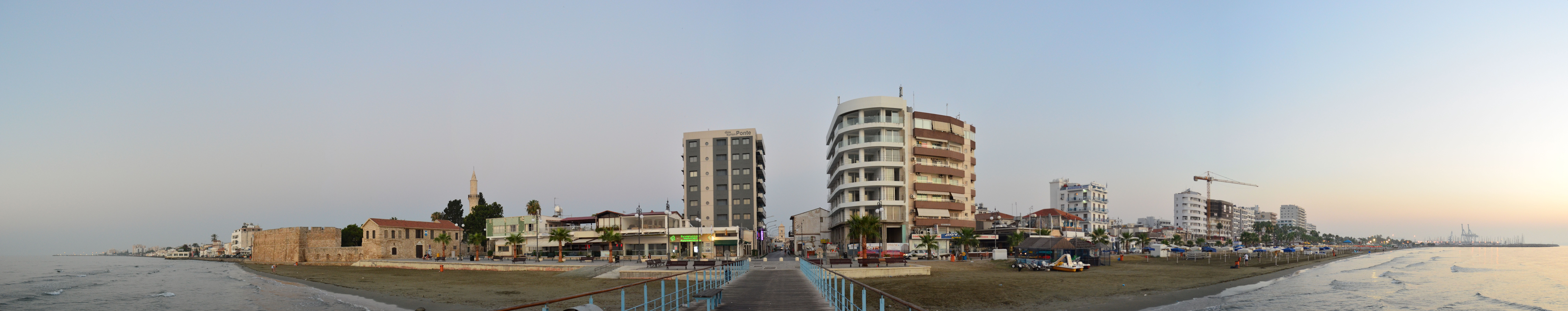
Larnaca seafront panorama

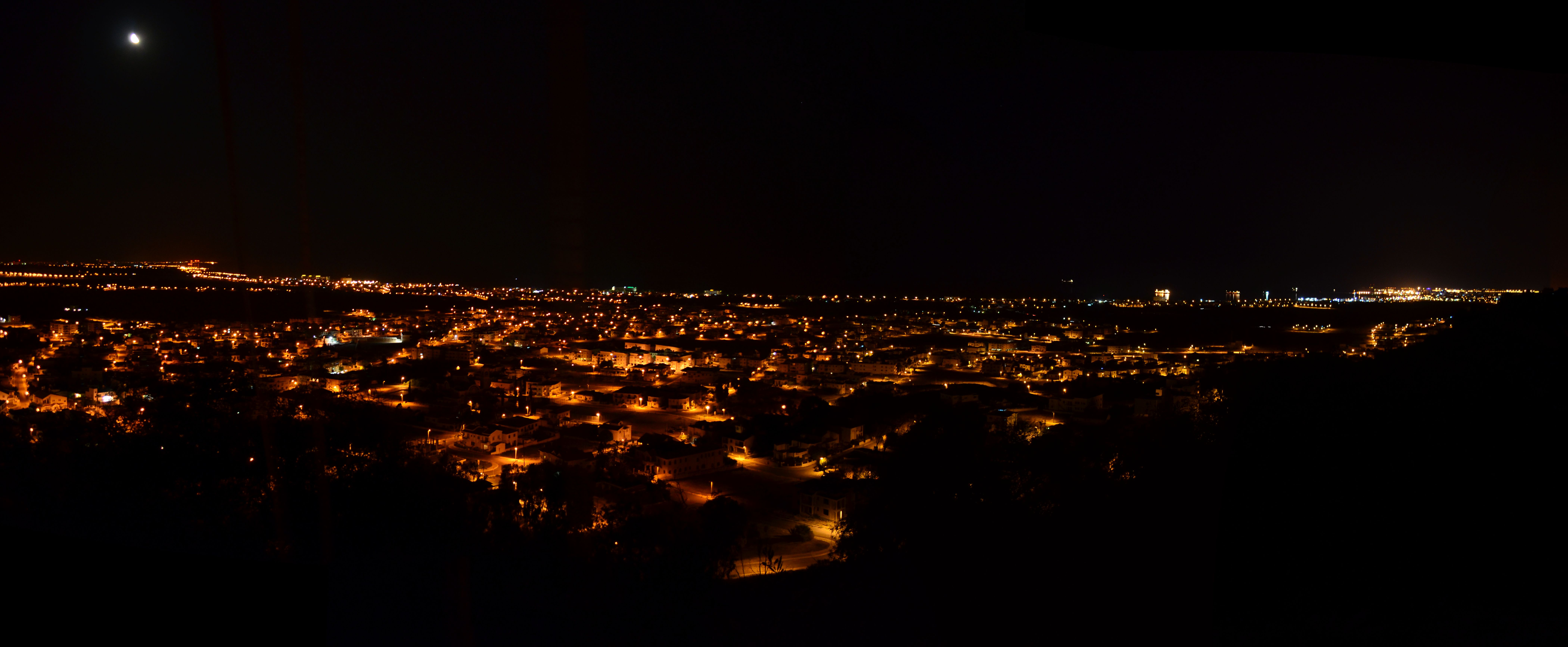
Panoramic view from Oroklini Hill towards Larnaca

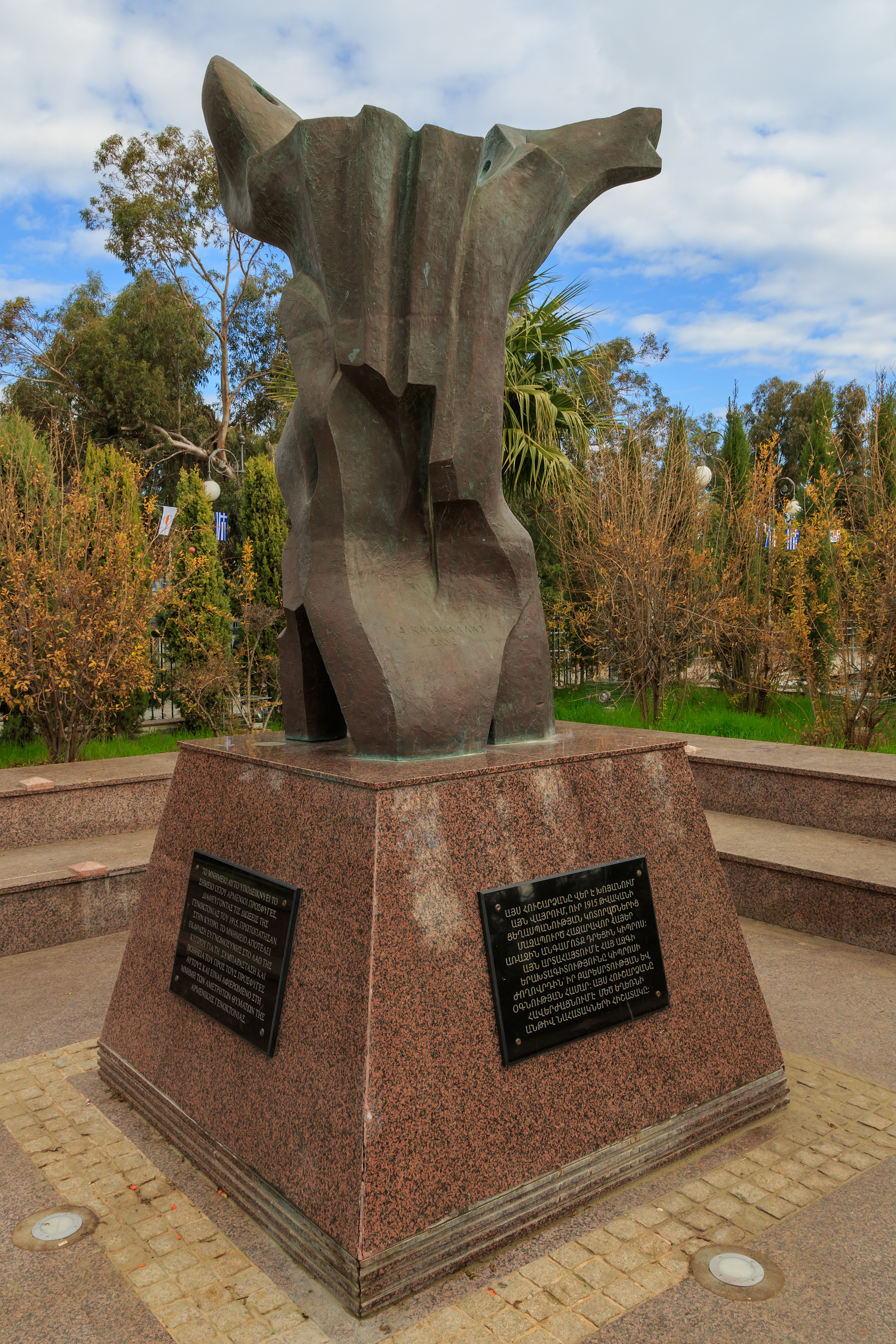
The Armenian Genocide Memorial, unveiled in 2008

== See also ==
- Larnaca District
- Kittim
- Chryspolitissa Orthodox Church
