= Asclepiades =

Asclepiades may refer to a number of different people:

== Mythology ==
- An epithet for the children of Asclepius, the god of healing; Hygieia, Iaso, Aceso, Aegle, Panacea, Machaon, Podaleirios, Telesphoros, Aratus

== Physicians ==
Ancient texts provide many long lists of physicians with the name "Asclepiades", most of whom are otherwise completely unknown. There are a scant few about whom we know a little:

- Asclepiades Philophysicus, physician who lived in or before the 2nd century BCE
- Asclepiades Titiensis, physician who lived in or before the 2nd century BCE
- Asclepiades of Bithynia (fl. c. 120–c. 40 BC), philosopher and physician from Prusa, Bithynia
- Caius Calpurnius Asclepiades of Prusa, b. 88 CE, second century physician
- Asclepiades Pharmacion (fl. 1st–2nd century), Greek physician
- Lucius Scribonius Asclepiades, an otherwise unknown person whom some writers believed to be the same person as Scribonius Largus

== Writers ==
- Asclepiades of Alexandria, grammarian from around the 5th century BC
- Asclepiades of Anazarba, historian of uncertain age, from Anazarbus
- Asclepiades of Tragilus (4th century BC), critic and mythographer, author of Tragoidoumena, cited in the Bibliotheca
- Asclepiades of Phlius (fl. 4th–3rd century BC), philosopher in the Eretrian school of Philosophy
- Asclepiades of Samos (fl. 3rd century BC), lyric poet
- Asclepiades of Cyprus, writer of around the 3rd century BC
- Asclepiades Mendes, ancient Egyptian writer on religion
- Asclepiades of Myrlea (fl. 2nd-1st century BC), Greek historian and grammarian in Rome and Spain
- Asclepiades the Cynic (fl. 4th century), Cynic philosopher

== Christianity ==
- Asclepiades of Antioch (died 217), Patriarch of Antioch, Christian saint and martyr
- Asclepiades (fl. c. 250), Christian saint and martyr (see Pionius)
- Asclepiades of Tralles, 5th century Christian bishop

== See also ==
- Asclepiad (disambiguation)
- Asclepius (disambiguation)
