= Kyriazis =

Kyriazis (Greek: Κυριαζής) is a Greek surname. Notable people with the surname include:

- Chrysanthos Kyriazis (born 1972), Greek volleyball player
- Damianos Kyriazis (1890–1948), Greek politician and philanthropist
- Georgios Kyriazis (born 1980), Greek footballer
- Ilias Kyriazis (born 1978), Greek comics artist
- Marios Kyriazis (born 1956), British/Greek Cypriot physician
- Neoklis Kyriazis (1877–1956), Greek Cypriot historian
