= Digraphia =

Using multiple writing systems for one language

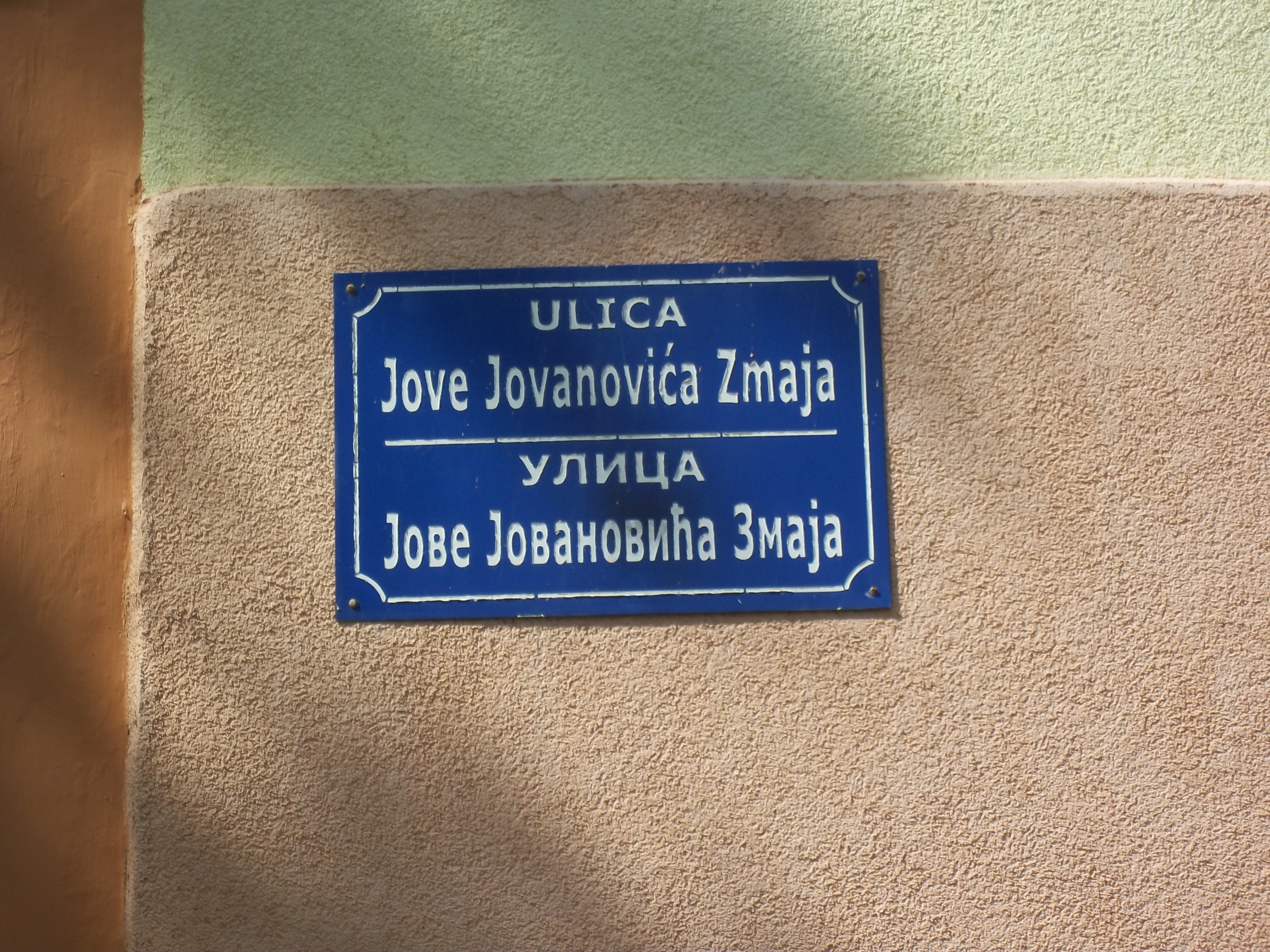
A digraphic Latin/Cyrillic street sign in Gaboš, Croatia

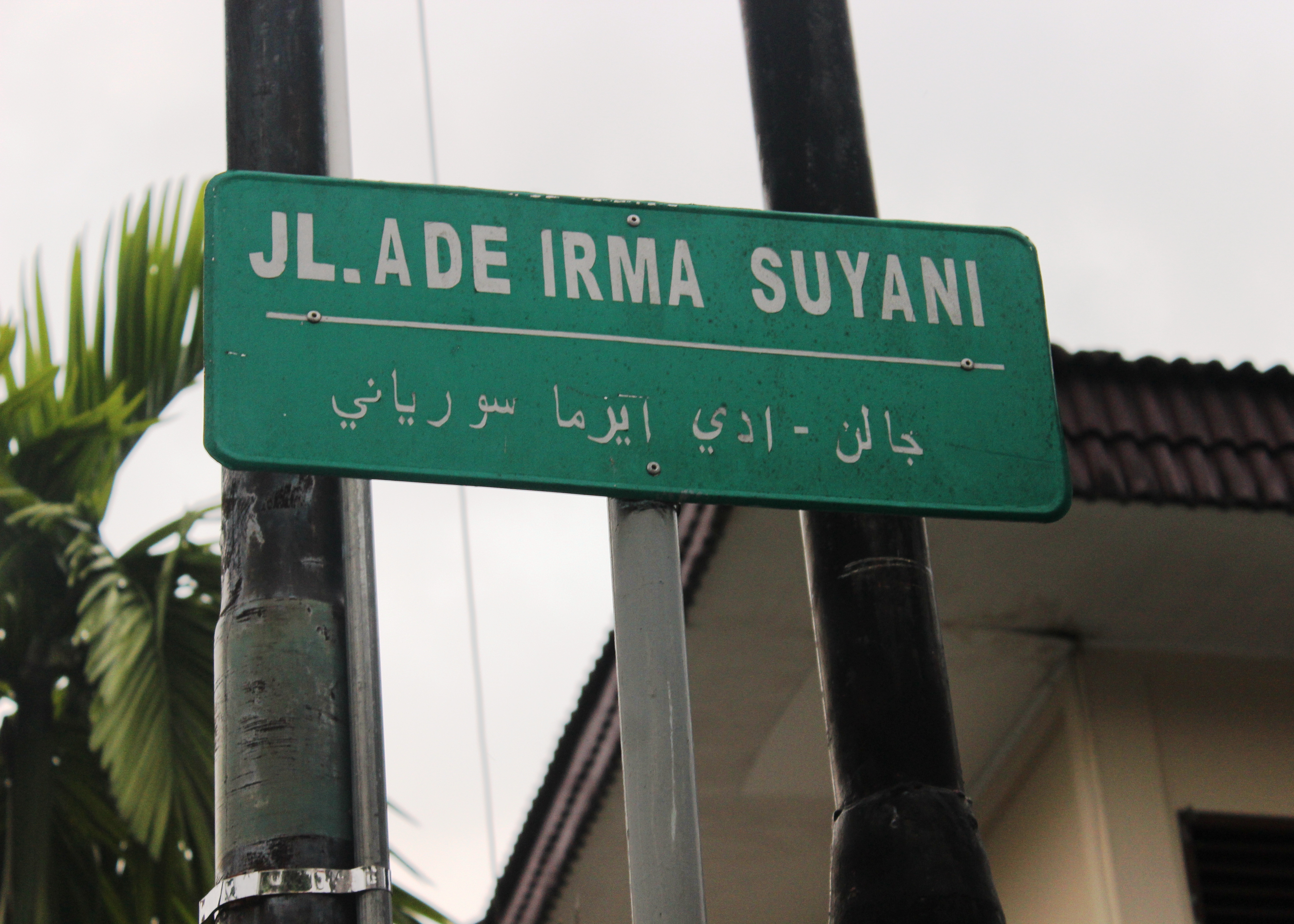
A digraphic Latin/Jawi street sign in Pekanbaru, Indonesia

In sociolinguistics, digraphia refers to the use of more than one writing system for the same language. Synchronic digraphia is the coexistence of two or more writing systems for the same language, while diachronic digraphia or sequential digraphia is the replacement of one writing system by another for a particular language.

Hindustani, with an Urdu literary standard written in Urdu alphabet and a Hindi standard written in Devanagari, is one of the "textbook examples" of synchronic digraphia, cases where writing systems are used contemporaneously. An example of diachronic digraphia, where one writing system replaces another, occurs in the case of Turkish, for which the traditional Arabic writing system was replaced with a Latin-based system in 1928.

Digraphia has implications in language planning, language policy, and language ideology.

== Terminology ==
=== Etymology ===
English digraphia, like French digraphie, etymologically derives from Greek di- δι- "twice" and -graphia -γραφία "writing".

Digraphia was modeled upon diglossia "the coexistence of two languages or dialects among a certain population", which derives from Greek diglossos δίγλωσσος "bilingual." Charles A. Ferguson, a founder of sociolinguistics, coined diglossia in 1959. Grivelet analyzes how the influence of diglossia on the unrelated notion of digraphia has "introduced some distortion in the process of defining digraphia," such as distinguishing "high" and "low" varieties. Peter Unseth notes one usage of "digraphia" that most closely parallels Ferguson's "diglossia," situations where a language uses different scripts for different domains; for instance, "shorthand in English, pinyin in Chinese for alphabetizing library files, etc. or several scripts which are replaced by Latin script during e-mail usage."

=== History ===
The Oxford English Dictionary, which does not yet include digraphia, enters two terms, digraph and digraphic. First, the linguistic term digraph is defined as, "A group of two letters expressing a simple sound of speech". This meaning applies to both two letters representing a single speech sound in orthography (e.g., English ng representing the velar nasal /ŋ/) and a single grapheme with two letters in typographical ligature (e.g., the Old English Latin alphabet letter æ). Second, the graph theory term digraph (a portmanteau from directed graph) is defined as, "A graph in which each line has a direction associated with it; a finite, non-empty set of elements together with a set of ordered pairs of these elements." The two digraph terms were first recorded in 1788 and 1955, respectively. The OED2 defines two digraphic meanings, "Pertaining to or of the nature of a digraph" and "Written in two different characters or alphabets." It gives their earliest examples in 1873 and 1880 (which was used meaning "digraphia"). Isaac Hollister Hall, an American scholar of Oriental studies, described an Eteocypriot language publication as "bilingual (or digraphic, as both inscriptions are in the same language)." Hall's article was antedated by Demetrios Pieridis's 1875 usage of digraphic instead of bilingual for an inscription written in both the Greek alphabet and Cypriot syllabary.

English digraphic and digraphia were contemporaneous with their corresponding terms in French linguistics. In 1877, Julius Oppert introduced digraphique to describe languages written in cuneiform syllabaries. In 1893, Auguste Barth used French digraphisme for Cambodian inscriptions written in Khmer script and Brāhmī script. In 1971, Robèrt Lafont coined digraphie regarding the sociolinguistics of French and Occitan.

Although the word "digraphia" is new, the practice is ancient. Darius the Great's (c. 522-486 BCE) Behistun Inscription was written in three cuneiform scripts for Old Persian, Elamite, and Babylonian.

=== Neologizers ===
Four authors independently neologized English digraphia from diglossia.

The Songhay linguist Petr Zima (1974) first used "digraphia" to describe the Hausa language having two writing systems, Boko (Latin script) and Ajami script (Arabic script). Zima differentiated these paired situations.

- Digraphia: "Two types of written form of one language co-exist, based upon the usage of two distinct graphical systems (scripts) by the respective language community."
- Diorthographia: "Two types of written form of a particular language co-exist, using the same script, but they are based upon the usage of two distinct orthographies by the same language community."

Usage of "diorthographia" is unusual. Compare dysgraphia meaning "a language disorder that affects a person's ability to write" and dysorthographia "a synonym for dyslexia".

The anthropologist James R. Jaquith (1976), who studied unconventional spelling in advertising, used "digraphia" to describe the practice of writing brand names in all caps (e.g., ARRID). He described digraphia as "the graphic analog of what linguists call diglossia", and defined it as "different versions of a written language exist simultaneously and in complementary distribution in a speech community."

The sociolinguist Ian R. H. Dale (1980) wrote a general survey of digraphia, defined as, "the use of two (or more) writing systems to represent varieties of a single language."

The sinologist and lexicographer John DeFrancis (1984) used digraphia, defined as "the use of two or more different systems of writing the same language," to translate Chinese shuangwenzhi (雙文制 "two-script system") of writing in Chinese characters and Pinyin. DeFrancis later explained, "I have been incorrectly credited with coining the term digraphia, which I indeed thought I had created as a parallel in writing to Charles Ferguson's diglossia in speech."

Hegyi coined and suggested the terms "bigraphism" and "multigraphism", but he only used them twice (p. 265; fn. 17, p. 268). However, he did not promote the use of either of these terms, nor follow up on his insights into the importance of studying "the use of two or more different writing systems for the same language... such cases have been more widespread than commonly assumed."

=== Usage ===
Digraphia is an uncommon term in current English usage. For instance, the Corpus of Contemporary American English, which includes over 425,000,000 words, lists digraphia three times in "academic genre" contexts.

Stéphane Grivelet, who edited a special "Digraphia: Writing systems and society" issue of the International Journal of the Sociology of Language, explains.

After 25 years and various articles on the subject, there are still important differences in the scope of the definition, and the notion itself is rarely used in sociolinguistics, apart from the field of Chinese studies, where the notion of digraphia is nowadays frequently used to describe the coexistence of two writing systems: Chinese script and Pinyin.

Digraphia has some rare synonyms. Orthographic diglossia antedates digraphia, and was noted by Paul Wexler in 1971." Bigraphism, bialphabetism, and biscriptality are infrequently used.

Some scholars avoid using the word "digraphia". Describing terminology for "script obsolescence," Stephen D. Houston, John Baines, and Jerrold Cooper say, "'Biscript' refers to a text in two different writing systems. 'Biliteracy' and 'triliteracy' label the concurrent use of two or three scripts."

== Theoretical aspects ==
Digraphia can be either "synchronic" (or "concurrent") or "diachronic" ("historical" or "sequential"), extending Ferdinand de Saussure's classic division between synchronic linguistics and diachronic linguistics. Dale first differentiated "diachronic (or historical) digraphia" ("more than one writing system used for a given language in successive periods of time") and "synchronic digraphia" ("more than one writing system used contemporaneously for the same language"). Dale concluded that,

Two primary factors have been identified as operating on a society in the choice of script for representing its language. These are the prevailing cultural influence (often a religion) and the prevailing political influence of the period in which the choice is made. Synchronic digraphia results when more than one such influence is operating and none can dominate all groups of speakers of the language in question [ … ] Diachronic digraphia results when different influences prevail over a given speech community at different times.

Some recent scholarship questions the practicality of this synchronic/diachronic distinction. Grivelet contends that, "digraphia is a single sociolinguistic process with two types of outcome (concurrent or sequential digraphia) and with specific features related to the causes and types of development of the various cases.

Peter Unseth lists and exemplifies four factors that can influence a language community's choice of a script.

1. "To identify themselves with a group." In the 1940s, Mongolia replaced the traditional Mongolian script first briefly with the Mongolian Latin alphabet and then, under Soviet influence, with the Mongolian Cyrillic alphabet. From the 1980s, the Mongolian script was reintroduced into schools for its historical and cultural importance.
2. "To distance themselves from a group." In the mid-19th century, the LDS Church developed and promoted the Deseret alphabet for English. Brigham Young publicly claimed it was more phonetically accurate than Latin script and would facilitate learning to read and write English. However, historian David Bigler says the Deseret alphabet "demonstrated cultural exclusivism, an important consideration. It also kept secrets from curious non-Mormons, [and] controlled what children would be allowed to read."
3. Participation in developments on a broader scale. The choice of a script can influence a group's preparedness to interact with other regional or international groups. For instance, the Hmong language has numerous alternate writing systems. Hmong who live in Southeast Asia prefer the indigenous Romanized Popular Alphabet (RPA) or the Pahawh Hmong semi-syllabary; Hmong expatriates who live in the United States prefer to romanize names differently, such as Latin Hmong instead of RPA Hmoob.
4. "Linguistic considerations." Sometimes a foreign script is rejected because it is unsuitable for the phonetics of a language. Korean was first written in logographic Hanja Chinese characters, but king Sejong the Great promulgated the Korean alphabet, which is better suited for transcribing Korean phonology. In the present day, North Korea uses only the alphabet, which it calls Chosŏn'gŭl. South Korea uses both Hanja and the alphabet, which it calls Hangul. The different names of the alphabet reflect the different names of Korea.

Linguists who study language and gender have analyzed gender-differentiated speech varieties ("genderlects", usually spoken by women), and there are a few cases of scripts predominantly used by women. Japanese hiragana was initially a women's script, for instance, used by Murasaki Shikibu to write The Tale of Genji. Chinese Nüshu script (literally "women's writing”) is a simplification of characters that was traditionally used by women in Jiangyong County of Hunan province.

Not only scripts, but also letters can have iconic power to differentiate social groups. For example, the names of many heavy metal bands (e.g., Motörhead, Infernäl Mäjesty, Mötley Crüe) use umlauts "to index the musical genre as well as the notion of 'Gothic' more generally." This digraphic usage is called the "metal umlaut" (or "röck döts").

== Synchronic digraphia ==
Synchronic digraphia is the coexistence of two or more writing systems for the same language. A modern example is the Serbo-Croatian language, which is written in either the Serbian Cyrillic alphabet or Gaj's Latin alphabet. Although most speakers can read and write both scripts, Catholic Croats and Muslim Bosniaks generally use Latin, while Orthodox Serbs and Montenegrins generally use Cyrillic. However, older indigenous scripts were used much earlier, most notably Bosnian Cyrillic. Inuktitut is also officially digraphic, using both Latin and Inuktitut syllabics. In Hindustani, the Devanagari or Urdu script generally follows the Hindi and Urdu standards and the speaker's religious affiliation, though Urdu is sometimes written in Devanagari in India. Digraphia is limited, however, in that most people know only one script. Similarly, depending on which side of the Punjab border a Punjabi language speaker lives in, India or Pakistan, and religious affiliation, they will use the Gurmukhi or Shahmukhi script respectively. The former shares similarities with Devanagari and the latter is essentially a derivative of the Urdu writing script (Perso-Arabic). The Arvanitic dialect of Albanian is written in both the Greek alphabet and Latin (Δασκαρίνα Πινότσ̈ι/Dhaskarina Pinoçi.)

The Japanese writing system has unusually complex digraphia. William C. Hannas distinguishes two digraphic forms of Japanese: "true digraphia" of occasionally using rōmaji Latin alphabet for a few loanwords like DVD, and of regularly using three scripts (technically, "trigraphia") for different functions. Japanese is written with kanji "Chinese character" logographs used for both Sino-Japanese vocabulary as well as native vocabulary; hiragana used for native Japanese words without kanji or difficult kanji, and for grammatical endings; and katakana used for foreign borrowings or graphic emphasis. Nihon, for instance, the primary name of Japan, is normally written 日本 (lit. "sun's origin") in kanji – but is occasionally written にほん in hiragana, ニホン in katakana, or Nihon in rōmaji ("romanization"). Japanese users have a certain amount of flexibility in choosing between scripts, and their choices can have social meaning.

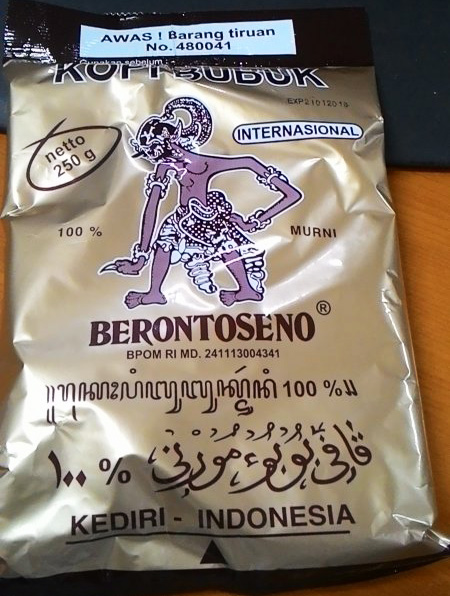
The use of Javanese script, Pegon (modified Arabic script) and Latin alphabet for coffee packaging in Indonesia saying 100% Pure Coffee Powder.

Another example is the Malay language, which most often uses the Latin alphabet, while in certain geographic areas (Kelantan state of Malaysia, Brunei) it is also written with an adapted Arabic alphabet called Jawi. Adaptations of the Arabic script are also widely used across the Malay Archipelago since the introduction of Islam. In Java, Javanese people, which were predominantly ruled by Hindu and Buddhist kingdoms, have their own writing system, called Hanacaraka. When the Islamic power took place, a modified Arabic writing system (called Pegon) was introduced, along with the massive introduction of the Latin alphabet by western colonialists. This results in the use of three writing systems to write modern Javanese, either based on a particular context (religious, cultural or normal), or sometimes also written simultaneously. This phenomenon also occurred in some other cultures in Indonesia.

An element of synchronic digraphia is present in many languages not using the Latin script, in particular in text messages and when typing on a computer which does not have the facility to represent the usual script for that language. In such cases, Latin script is often used, although systems of transcription are often not standardised.

Digraphia is controversial in modern Written Chinese. The ongoing debate on traditional and simplified Chinese characters concerns "diglyphia" or "pluricentricity" rather than digraphia. Chinese digraphia involves the use of both Chinese characters and Hanyu Pinyin romanization. Pinyin is officially approved for a few special uses, such as annotating characters for learners of Chinese and transcribing Chinese names. Nevertheless, Pinyin continues to be adopted for other functions, such as computers, education, library catalogs, and merchandise labels. Among Chinese input methods for computers, Pinyin is the most popular phonetic method. Zhou Youguang predicts, "Digraphia is perhaps the key for Chinese to enter the age of Information processing." Many writers, both from China (e.g., Mao Dun and Zhou Youguang) and from abroad (e.g., John DeFrancis, Victor H. Mair, J. Marshall Unger, and William Hannas) have argued for digraphia to be implemented as a Chinese language standard. These digraphic reformers call for a generalized use of Pinyin orthography along with Chinese characters. Yat-Shing Cheung differentiates three Chinese digraphic situations. (1) Both the High and the Low forms derive from the same script system: traditional and simplified characters. (2) Both forms derive from the same system but the Low form borrows foreign elements: Putonghua and Fangyan. (3) The High and the Low forms derive from two different script systems: Chinese characters and pinyin.

Other examples of synchronic digraphia:

- Balinese was written in the Balinese script especially in palm-leaf manuscripts for religious purposes. However, similar to Javanese, it is now largely written in Latin. Attempts to popularize the script through counseling and using it public spaces are supported by the local government.
- Javanese was written in the Javanese script, but is now largely written in Latin. Attempts to reintroduce the Javanese script are gaining popularity. The use of Pegon is limited to pesantren, traditional Islamic boarding schools.
- Kashmiri is written in Sharada, Devanagari, Nastaliq, and Latin scripts.
- Kazakh is written in Arabic in Xinjiang; in Kazakhstan, it is written in Cyrillic (though, in an instance of diachronic digraphia, the Kazakh government plans to transition to Latin by 2031).
- Konkani is written in five scripts: Devanagari, Kannada, Latin, Malayalam and Perso-Arabic.
- Marathi was historically written simultaneously in Balbodh Devanagari and Modi script until the 1940s, after which Devanagari was preferred over Modi script due to a lack of printing infrastructure for the latter.
- Persian is today written in the Perso-Arabic script in Iran (where the language is called Farsi) and in Afghanistan (where it is called Dari), but in Cyrillic in Tajikistan (called Tajik).
- Punjabi uses two different writing systems: the Brahmic Gurmukhi script used in Indian Punjab, and the Perso-Arabic Shahmukhi used in Pakistani Punjab.
- Sundanese now largely written in Latin, was written in both the Sundanese script and the Javanese script. The reintroduction of the Sundanese script has gained popularity in recent years.
- Tashelhit was historically written in Perso-Arabic and there are still people who use it. The Latin script is mostly common among people, while the Tifinagh script is the official script but not widely found outside of official uses.
- Uzbek was written in the Cyrillic script from the 1940s until 1993, when a Latin-based alphabet was made official in Uzbekistan. While the Latin-based alphabet is widely used online, As of 2024 the Cyrillic alphabet is just as common on the Internet and is still the main script of most of the printed media, with most people able to read both much as in Serbia.

== Diachronic digraphia ==
Diachronic or sequential digraphia, in which a language switches writing systems, can occur gradually through language change or more quickly though language reform. Turkish switched from Arabic script to Latin within one year, under reforms ordered by Mustafa Kemal Atatürk, while the transition from writing Korean in Chinese characters to writing in Hangul took hundreds of years.

There are many examples of languages that used to be written in a script that was later replaced. Examples are Romanian (which originally used Cyrillic and changed to Latin) in the 1860s; Vietnamese (which switched from a form of Chinese writing called Chữ Nôm to the Latin alphabet); Turkish, Swahili, Somali, and (partially) Malay, which all switched from Arabic script to the Latin alphabet, and many countries of the former Soviet Union, which abandoned the Cyrillic script after the dissolution of the USSR, such as Moldova, Azerbaijan, Turkmenistan, and Uzbekistan, which all switched from Cyrillic to Latin. As old literature in the earlier scripts remains, there is typically some continuing overlap in use, by scholars studying earlier texts, reprinting of earlier materials for contemporary readers, and other limited uses.

The Azerbaijani language provides an extreme example of diachronic digraphia: it has historically been written in Old Turkic, Arabic, Latin, Cyrillic, and again Latin.

Other examples of diachronic digraphia include the following:

- In Kazakhstan, Kazakh is written in Cyrillic, but a transition to Latin has been scheduled to take place by 2031.
- Malay was traditionally written in Jawi, but that has now been largely replaced by Latin.
- Since 2025, the Mongolian government has made the traditional Mongolian script co-official with the previously used Cyrillic script to write the Mongolian language.

== See also ==
- Official script
- Diglossia

== Relevant literature ==
- Iyengar, Arvind. 2021. A diachronic analysis of Sindhi multiscriptality. Journal of Historical Sociolinguistics 6.1. DOI: https://doi.org/10.1515/jhsl-2019-0027
- Elti Di Rodeano, Sveva. "Digraphia: the Story of a Sociolinguistic Term". Grapholinguistics and Its Applications. Brest: 111–126. doi:10.36824/2018-graf-elti.
