= Asclepius (disambiguation) =

Asclepius (Latin: Aesculapius) is the Greek god of medicine and healing.

Asclepius (also spelled Asklepios or Asclepios) may also refer to:

- Asclepius (grammarian), Ancient Greek grammarian of uncertain date
- Asclepius (treatise), a Hermetic treatise written c. 100–300
- Asclepius, one of the Argonauts, a band of heroes in Greek mythology
- Asclepius of Tralles, Alexandrian scholar (died c. 560–570)
- Asclepius, mid-fifth century Catholic bishop of Baia, Numidia
- A town in Pontus, now İskilip, Asian Turkey
- Asklepios Kliniken, German private hospitals group
- Asclepius (Sikelianos), an unfinished tragedy by Angelos Sikelianos
- 4581 Asclepius, an asteroid
- Awali (river), formerly known as the River Asclepius

== See also ==
- Asclepias
- Asclepiades (disambiguation)
- Ophiuchus (astrology)
- Temple of Asclepius (disambiguation)
