= Ioannis Sykoutris =

Greek classical scholar (1901–1937)

Ioannis Sykutris
- Ιωάννης Συκουτρής
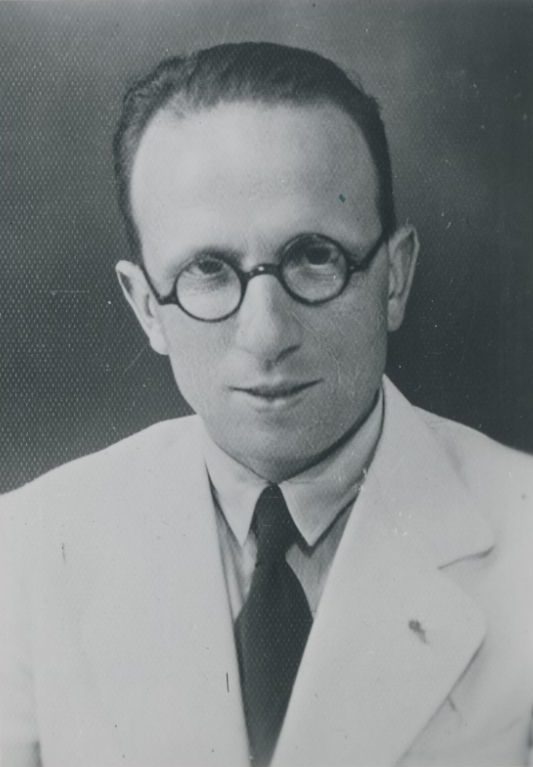
- Born: Ἰωάννης Συκουτρῆς; 1 December 1901; Smyrna, Ottoman Empire
- Died: 22 July 1937 (aged 35); Corinth, Greece

Academic background
- Education: University of Athens
- Thesis: Μιχαὴλ Ψελλοῦ, Βίος καὶ πολιτεία τοῦ Ὁσίου Αὐξεντίου (1924)

Academic work
- Notable works: Πλάτωνος Συμπόσιον (1934); Ἀριστοτέλους Περὶ ποιητικῆς (1937)

Ioannis Sykoutris (also Johannes Sykutris; Greek: Ιωάννης Συκουτρής; 1 December 1901 – 22 September 1937) was a Greek classical philologist and professor at the University of Athens.

== Early life and education ==
Sykoutris was born in 1901 in Smyrna to a very poor family of Chian origin. He graduated in 1918 from the Evangelical School of Smyrna and became a school teacher. In 1919, he went to Athens where he studied at the Faculty of Letters of the University of Athens, graduating in 1922. With the burning of Smyrna in 1922, his family came to Athens.

In 1925, he went to Leipzig and Berlin for further studies and returned to Greece in 1929.

== Career ==
Between 1922 and 1924 he taught philosophy, ancient Greek and modern Greek at the Pancyprian Seminary of Larnaca (Παγκύπριο Ιεροδιδασκαλείο Λάρνακας). He was interested in Cypriot history and ethnography and he travelled across the island to collect material for his research. While in Cyprus, in January 1923, he founded with other literary figures of the time, such as Neoklis Kyriazis and Nikodimos Mylonas, the first Cypriot literary journal, Kypriaka Chronika.

In 1924, he returned to Greece, where he worked in the Philosophiko Spoudastirio (Φιλοσοφικό Σπουδαστήριο). In 1929, he taught at the Arsakeio, subsequently he was employed at the Academy of Athens and finally as a lecturer of Ancient Greek literature at the University of Athens. Some of his favourite students were Antonis Moraitis [el], and Demetrios Capetanakis.

Together with Simos Menardos, he revived the series of Hellenike Bibliotheke of Adamantios Korais, under the auspices of the Academy of Athens.

== Personal life and death ==
He died by suicide in Corinth in 1937 at the age of 35. It is believed that the reason for his suicide was the backlash of his publication of Plato's Symposium and Sykoutris' treatment of homosexuality and pederasty as a component of classical Greek culture.

== Legacy ==
Sykoutris is considered among the founders of the field of Cyprological studies, together with Athanasios Sakellarios and Konstantinos Sathas. He contributed significantly to the subject of Hellenic and Byzantine studies. He gave the archive of his work in Cyprus to his friend Louis Loizou from Famagusta, and it was lost during the 1974 war.

== Publications ==
- Συκουτρής, Ιω. Α. (Οκτώβριος 1923). «Τζιυπριώτικα τραούδκια, Λευκοσία 1923 (κρίσις)», Κυπριακά Χρονικά, 10, 305–308.
- Συκουτρής, Ιω. Α. (30.11.1923). «Ποιητικόν αίσθημα εν Κύπρω», εφ. Σάλπιγξ, αρ. 2077, 3.
- Συκουτρής, Ιω. Α. (7.12.1923). «Ποιητικόν αίσθημα εν Κύπρω», εφ. Σάλπιγξ, αρ. 2078.
- Συκουτρής, Ι. (1925) Κριτικά εις Αντιφώντα. Επιστημονική Επετηρίς της Φιλοσοφικής Σχολής του Πανεπιστημίου Αθηνών, Περίοδος Α΄ Τόμος 1, 109–145.
- Sykutris, J. (1927). Ein neues Papiaszitat, Zeitschrift für die Neutestamentliche Wissenschaft und die Kunde der Älteren Kirche, 26, 210–212.
- Sykutris, J. (1927). Isokrates’ Euagoras, Hermes, 62, 1, 24–53.
- Sykutris, J. (1928). Solon und Soloi, Philologus, 83, 1–4, 445–449.
- Sykutris, J. (1928). Epigramm aus Kition. Hermes, 63, 4, 110–111.
- Sykutris, J. (1928). Der Demosthenische Epitaphios. Hermes, 63, 2, 241–258.
- Sykutris, J. (1929). Zum Geschichtswerk des Psellos, Byzantinische Zeitschrift, 30, 1, 61–67.
- Sykutris, J. Die Briefe des Sokrates und der Sokratiker (Studien zur Geschichte und Kultur des Altertums. XVIII. Band, 2. Heft).
- (1934). Πλάτωνος, Συμπόσιον, κείμενον, μετάφρασις και ερμηνεία υπό Ι. Συκουτρή, Ακαδημία Αθηνών, Ελληνική Βιβλιοθήκη, Αθήναι.
- Συκουτρής, I. (1935). Κριτικαί εκδόσεις νεοελληνικών λογοτεχνημάτων. Νέα Εστία, 18, 99–1000.
- Συκουτρής, I. (1936). Ο Δωδεκάλογος του γύφτου του Κ. Παλαμά: Δύο διαλέξεις. Αθήναι.
- (1937). Αριστοτέλους περί ποιητικής / μετάφρασις υπό Σίμου Μενάρδου; εισαγωγή, κείμενον και ερμηνεία υπό Ι. Συκουτρή Αθήναι: Ιωάννης Δ. Κολλάρος Βιβλιοπωλείον της Εστίας,
