= Marios Kyriazis =

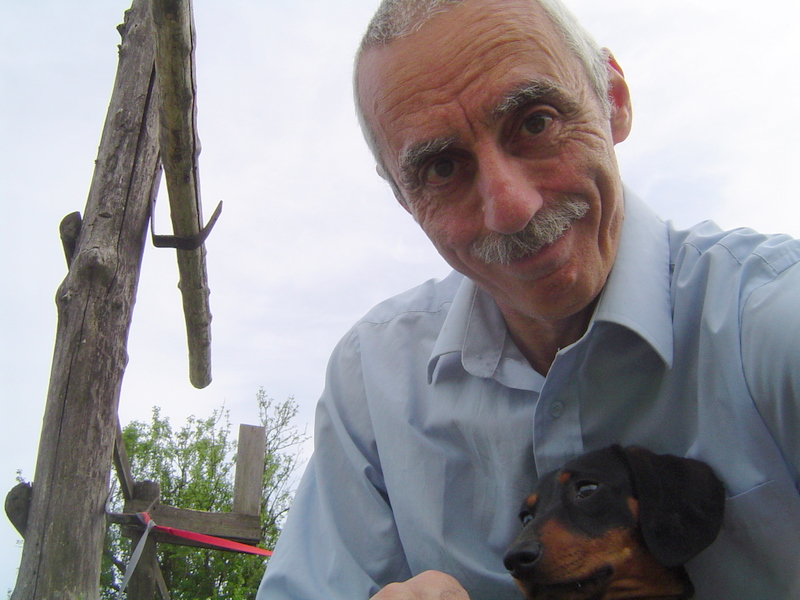
- Born: 11 March 1956 (age 70); Larnaca, Cyprus
- Occupations: Anti-aging Physician and Biogerontologist
- Years active: 30
- Known for: Work in Life Extension

Marios Kyriazis (Greek: Μάριος Κυριαζής; born 11 March 1956) is a Cypriot physician, gerontologist, author, and researcher known for his work in biogerontology, healthy ageing, hormesis, complexity science, and life-extension studies.

His research has focused on theoretical and clinical aspects of ageing, particularly the interaction between biological systems, environmental stimulation, technology, information exposure, and adaptive stress responses.

He has been associated with organizations including the National Gerontology Centre in Cyprus, the British Longevity Society, and the ELPIs Foundation for Indefinite Lifespans.

== Early life and education ==
Kyriazis was born in Larnaca, Cyprus. He received his early education in Cyprus and later studied medicine in Italy, attending the University of Perugia before completing medical training at the University of Rome. Following medical qualification, he undertook clinical and preclinical work in Cyprus, the United Kingdom, and the United States. He subsequently obtained postgraduate training in geriatric medicine and became associated with professional biological and gerontological organizations in the United Kingdom.

== Medical history ==
Following the tradition of other benefactors in his family (such as his grandfather Dr Neoclis Kyriazis and his great- uncle Damianos Kyriazis), in 2008 he founded the Kyriazis Medical Museum, a cultural charitable foundation aiming to safeguard old medical items and traditions of Cyprus, and to educate the public on the Cypriot Medical History.

Kyriazis initially practiced clinical medicine, including work in acute and geriatric care. In 1996, Kyriazis founded the Historical Medical Equipment Society, which aims to study old medical instruments related to the history of medicine in the UK. The first public lecture was delivered at the University of London with support from the Wellcome Trust. As of July 2018, the society no longer exists.

During the 1990s and 2000s he became increasingly involved in ageing research and longevity medicine. He founded or participated in several organizations devoted to ageing studies, including the British Longevity Society and later the ELPIs Foundation for Indefinite Lifespans. His work has combined elements of clinical gerontology, systems biology, cybernetics, evolutionary theory, and complexity science.

In 2001, in association with the Larnaca Municipality, he organised an exhibition on the medical history in Cyprus with the theme "Medicine in Ancient Kition and Old Larnaca", accompanied by a book on the matter with the same title.

He has also served as Scientific Director of the National Gerontology Centre in Cyprus and has participated in academic and policy-related networks concerned with ageing research.

Currently, he is Specialty Chief Editor, for the academic journal Frontiers in Geriatric Medicine.

== See also ==
- Anti-aging movement
- Biological Immortality
