= Henchir-El-Hammam =

Henchir-El-Hammam may refer to the following modern sites with Ancient ruins (notably of former episcopal sees) of former Roman North Africa :

- Baia, Numidia, also Henchir-Settara
- Caesarea in Numidia
