= Caius Calpurnius Asclepiades of Prusa =

Ancient physician

Caius Calpurnius Asclepiades of Prusa also known as Phylophysicus was a physician who flourished in the second century during the reign of Hadrian. Born in Prusia, Bithynia in 88 CE, he wrote several books on the composition of medicines, both internal and external. The Greek physician Galen recorded some of Asclepiades' medical formulas in his works. He was presented by emperor Trajan with the revenues of seven cities for himself and his family and served as one of the assessors of Roman magistrates in charge of voting tablets. The biographer Antonio Cocchi noted that there were over forty men of history with the name Asclepiades and wrote that this Asclepiades of Prusa was a fellow countryman of, and perhaps a lineal descendant of the Asclepiades who died in 40 BCE.

He was married to Veronia Chelidonia for 51 years and died aged 70.

== See also ==
- Asclepiades (disambiguation)
