= Demetrios Pieridis =

Greek educator

Demetrios Pierides (Greek: Δημήτρης Πιερίδης; 1811–1895) was a Greek Cypriot banker, vice consul of Great Britain and collector of ancient Cypriot artefacts. He was the son of Pierakis Demetriou Corella (1790–1821) and Maria Caridi (c. 1775 – 1870)

== Career ==
He studied history and literature in England and was a private tutor of Greek of the Duke of Sutherland. At a later stage he was a professor of English language in Greece.

Pierides was the Director of Ottoman Bank in Larnaca. In 1849 he took part in an expedition, led by Royal Navy Captain T.Graves, to compile the first proper map of Cyprus. He was a Member of Parliament (1884-1885) in Cyprus, and vice consul of England (1849-1850).

== Antiquities ==
His interest in ancient history of Cyprus and will to prevent art dealers from selling the rich cultural heritage to foreign collectors of antiques, made Demetrios Pierides a collector of ancient artefacts. By that he managed to keep an important part of Cyprus handicraft history on the island. Parts of his collections laid the ground for the Pierides Museum.

Pierides was one of the founding members of the Cyprus Museum. Many European intellectuals who knew Pieridis, used to call him "The Wise Greek". he wrote many scientific articles on Cypriot antiquities both in English and in French.

== Family ==
Pierides married Theodora Cyprael Halil (b. 1819-d.1859) and had two sons, Zenon D. Pierides and Gabriel-Cyprael Pierides. He also had five daughters (Adelais, Kalliope, Maritsa, Anna and Thecla).

His father Pierakis was a merchant and land owner in Cyprus. He was hanged by the Turks, together with other prominent lay men and Bishops, on 10 July 1821 as a punishment for the Greek uprising.

The family motto is "Emmenein", meaning "Persistence".
