= Damianos Kyriazis =

Greek politician

Damianos Kyriazis (Greek: Δαμιανός Κυριαζής; 1890–1948) was a Greek politician, industrialist, collector, and benefactor from a Kissos family, in Mt Pelion, who left a significant legacy of important historical documents.

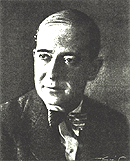
Damianos Kyriazis.

== Family ==
Damianos Kyriazis was the first-born son of Ioannis Kyriazis (1853–1919), one of five brothers from Kissos, Greece, who founded the cigarette empire Kyriazi Freres. His mother Maria (Marilita) Ritonides was from a rich ship-owner family. He had four sisters (Euterpi Kolas, Elena Aliveratos, Euthalia Naoum, Ioanna Leon Melas) and one brother (Costadinos). He was born in Cairo, but grew up in Volos, Greece, where he was first educated. Kyriazis married Angela Synnefia and had one daughter, Maria Kyriazis-Spenza. Damianos Kyriazis was a first cousin of Dr Neoclis Kyriazis, another collector of historical documents.

== Career ==
He studied at the Universities of Athens and Zurich. While studying Politics in Leipzig he also attended the Conservatory there from 1909 until 1911 to study piano playing with Karl Wendling. In 1914 (or 1916) Kyriazis was awarded a Diploma (PhD) in Politics and Law from the School of Philosophy in Leipzig. He returned to Greece and was employed as a senior director of the department of Industry at the Ministry of National Finance. He was a Member of Parliament and in 1932 he briefly became Minister of Finance. One of his works was a study on ‘the development of handicraft in today’s Greece' (in German), but he wrote several other essays or books. Kyriazis was a member of several political, cultural and scientific organisations including local musical societies.

He continued working at his family’s cigarette factories (Kyriazi Freres) and, together with his brother Costadinos, opened custom-built factories in Amsterdam and Hamburg. When he became a Finance Minister of Greece he relinquished his position at the Kyriazi Freres board.

== Collections and donations ==
Kyriazis was an avid collector of books and manuscripts relating to the Balkans. He donated many of his possessions to the National Archaeological Museum of Greece. A large number of his books and manuscripts were donated to the Damianos Kyriazis wing of the Benaki Museum in Athens. Another donation to the Gennadeion Library included important papers of Ali Pasha, 41 rare manuscripts, 860 books and others. Certain items from this collection were displayed in New York City and at the Victoria & Albert Museum in London. In addition, in his will he left funds for the construction of the Public Library in Volos, where he also left substantial numbers of his book and document collection.
