= Cariddi =

- Pronunciation: /kəˈriːdi/
- Language: Greek, Italian

Origin
- Origin: Mycenaean Greece (via Greek Karideus/Karidis), Roman nobility (via Julius Caesar)
- Meaning: Derived from the Greek word for "walnut" (Καρύδης)
- Region of origin: Ancient Rome, Sicily, Ionian Islands (Greece), Cyprus

Other names
- Variant forms: Karydis, Carydis, Karydi, Caridi

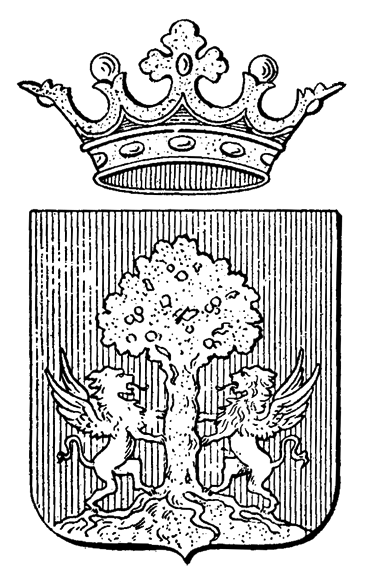
A more extensive depiction of the coat of arms.

The Cariddi (or Karydis, Carydis, Karydi, Caridi) family surname is believed to have its roots deep into antiquity. Julius Caesar refers to the Caridi family in his 'Commentaries' (c. 50 BC). However the name, which in Greek is Karideus/Karidis (Καρύδης), existed in ancient times because its root can be traced back to the Myceneans (at least 1000 BC) like so: Ka-Ri-Se-U (Keriseus-Karideus)

More recent evidence regarding the Caridi family is provided by the Renaissance genealogist Mugnos. He remarks that there were 'some' men (i.e. not just one) mentioned by Julius Caesar, who had this surname, i.e. they already were an established family with ancestors and descendants. According to Mugnos, they were 'noteworthy' (in Italian 'chiari'), and this suggests that they were high officials and of considerable standing in order to be important enough to be mentioned by Julius Caesar. The family as a whole was most likely a member of the Ancient Roman nobility, who had their sons sent to the army to become military leaders, as it was the custom at the time.

After the fall of the Roman Empire, these families survived during the Middle Ages (c. 700-1200AD) perhaps under Papal rule in Rome. It is possible that branches of this family lived in Byzantine territories.

== Italian branch ==
From these middle age families, originated the more modern families of the Roman nobility (1200–1600) (3, p. 131). From Rome, a branch of the Caridi family moved to the city of Messina, Sicily during the reign of King Martino, c1392. An Antonio Cariddi was gentiluomo maggiore (major gentleman) in the court of the Queen Marianna, c. 1390.

The Italian genealogist Scorza confirms that the family was originally Roman and that they subsequently moved to Messina. The fact that members of the family were officials in the royal court in 1390s, i.e. immediately after they first moved to Messina, suggests that this Roman family belonged to the Italian nobility from earlier years. Also the great number of the Caridi members who went to become high officials in royal and civil courts during the years, indicates that the family as a whole had strong roots in the nobility for many centuries in the times before the move to Messina.

Another Italian genealogist Mango highlights: "Caridi is a noble family (famiglia nobile), a family of judges, doctors and others

from Messina, Sicily".

Galuppi confirms that the family flourished from the 14th to the 18th centuries. From the ordinary nobility, the whole family was upgraded to the civilian senate. A Mario Caridi (born c. 1570) was registered in the nobility books of 1587–1610. He had the title of 'Misser' i.e. a graduate doctor (7). He was married to Maria Marullo, descendant of an important nobility family from Messina. Galuppi also mentions a Giovan Pietro Cariddi who was one of the founders of the Ordine dei Cavalieri della Stella. This was a military order which started in Messina in 1595 and became extinct in 1687. It consisted of 100 'nobilissimi cavalieri' (most nobile knights) who, to join, had to show a record of an unbroken family lineage of belonging to the nobility for at least 200 years. This places the date of origin of the Messina branch to about 1390.

== Greek branch ==
Genealogical registration of the Caridi family in the nobility lists of Cephalonia.

In later years, a Gianni Cariddi was mentioned as being a noble in Malvasia (Monemvasia, Greece) in 1552 and his sons were nobles after him. Then,

two brothers, Nicolo and Leo, Counts Caridi moved to Cephallonia, in the Ionian Islands (8). During 1590 were given further nobility titles, according to the Livre d'or De la Noblesse Ionienne (9).

In Cephallonia the original head of the family was a marquis, a title given to him by the Venetian government. A Gianni Caridi (c. 1510) had the nobility title 'Gabellator' given to him and his branch by the Doge of Venice 1552 (9). A Pantazi Caridi (1710–1781) became Regent of the Ionian Islands.

From Cephallonia, a branch moved to Lefkada, Greece and another to Larnaca, Cyprus during the early 18th century. The head of this branch was Giovanni Caridi (born c. 1640 in Cephallonia), with his two sons Christodulos (born c. 1685) and Pietro (c. 1690) who was a medical doctor (11). Christodulos had the nobility title 'Kaminaris' given to him while briefly living in Hungary. One of Christodulos's sons, Constadinos, became Bishop Athanasios of Nikomidea and subsequently a holy martyr of the Greek Orthodox Church. Pietro's son, Adronicos, was a Cypriot dragoman of the Imperial Majesty the Queen of Hungary.

There are several descending lines of the Cyprus branch still living on the island including a line descending from Maria Caridi (c. 1780-1870). She was married to Demetrios Pieridis, of the current Pieridis Museum and Cultural Foundation in Cyprus (11).

Many members of the Greek branch still live in the Ionan islands, especially in Corfu (Kerkyra).

Notable contemporary Caridis:

- Constantinos Carydis - Composer and conductor (symphonic and operatic repertories)
- Dimitris N. Karidis - Architect and urban historian
- Carmine Caridi - Actor
- Joseph Caridi - Mobster
- Linda Caridi - Actress
- Olivia Caridi - News Anchor, The Bachelor contestant
- Tony Caridi - Sportscaster
- Tony J. Caridi - Author/Journalist
- Gaetano Caridi - Italian Footballer
- Nadine Caridi - American psychologist and former model
- Spyros Chr. Karydis - Greek Historian
- Smaragda Karydi - Actress
- Dinos Karydis - Actor
- Sofoklis Karydis - Journalist/Poet
- Athanasios of Nicomedia - Metropolitan

From at least the early 13th century the family had the same coat of arms: A golden walnut tree (Karidis in Greek means walnut) in red background, with a griffin on either side (counter rampant).
