= Asclepiad =

Asclepiad may refer to:

- A plant of the former family Asclepiadaceae
- Asclepiad (poetry), a type of metrical line used in lyric poetry
- Asclepiad (title), an ancient Greek title of uncertain profession, most likely a physician or healing priest
- The Asclepiad, a periodical published by Benjamin Ward Richardson, 1861, 1884–1895

== See also ==
- Asclepiades (disambiguation)
