= Temple of Asclepius =

Temple of Asclepius may refer to:

- Asclepieion of Athens
- Temple of Asclepius, Epidaurus
- Temple of Asclepius, Rome
- Temple of Asclepius, Augusta Treverorum
- Temple of Aesculapius (Villa Borghese)
- Asclepieion

== See also ==
- Asclepius (disambiguation)
