= Kyriazi Freres =

Egyptian cigarette company established in 1873

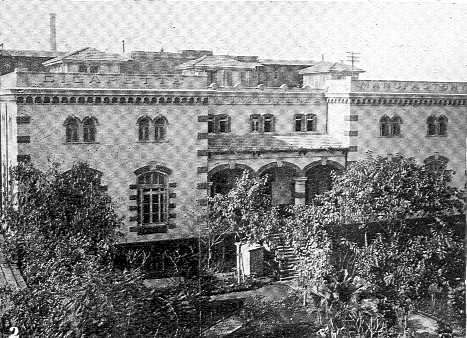
The Kyriazi Freres factory and gardens

Kyriazi Freres (also spelled Kyriazi Frères and incorrectly "Kiriazi") was a cigarette manufacturing company established in 1873 in Egypt. The company was founded by Ioannis Kyriazis, together with his brothers Efstathios and Epaminondas, although his other two brothers, George and Dimitris also played an active role in the company.

Neoklis Kyriazis, the son of George, would later become a medical doctor who, through his lectures on hygiene, warned the public about the health risks of tobacco smoke.

== History ==
Ioannis’ father was Kyriazis Hadji-Kyriazis (b. 1817) from Kissos, in Mt. Pelion in Thessaly (Greece). He was a tobacco and overcoat merchant, married to Keratso Alexopoulou (first wife) and Maria (b1820, second wife). Ioannis went into the tobacco business in Smyrna, but was forced out of Greece by the imposition of the Turkish tobacco monopoly. He founded a company for the importation of tobacco and a cigarette factory in Muski Street in Cairo in Egypt, which later became known as Kyriazi Freres. The company was formally established in 1873, as advertised on all their products. In 1897 the brothers constructed a purpose-built factory in the Cairo district of Tewfikieh and they employed over 500 workers to manufacture hand-made cigarettes.

The company expanded due to a successful advertising campaign and their brands became known across Europe and the Middle East. They had an outlet at 20 Cheapside, London, as well as agents in Austria, Hungary and Switzerland. By 1901, Kyriazi Freres were exporting over 103 million cigarettes a year. Some years later the sons of Ioannis (Damianos and Constantinos b.1891-d.1962) opened custom-built factories in Amsterdam, the Netherlands (1922) and in Hamburg, Germany (1925).

Their most well known brands were Aris, Astra, Conqueror Extra, Egyptica, Emir, Ferik, Finas, Ideal, Imperatore, Neptune, Special, and Zenith. These brands were awarded several quality awards in exhibitions and trade fairs.

== Advertisement and society ==
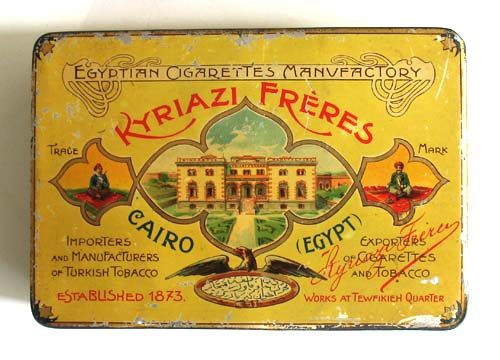
A Kyriazi Freres cigarette tin

Advertisement campaigns by the firm played a part in the re-structuring of the Middle Eastern (particularly the Egyptian) social classes. This was because their campaigns were aimed at equating Western high social status with their brands, and using local up-and-coming gentlemen to endorse their products. Advertisers used the cigarette as a social status symbol. The advertisers wanted to reach a select small group of people, unlike today's mass marketing techniques. In this particular case the aim was to reach the effendis (upward moving local professionals) and used a snob effect to persuade them that buying Kyriazi Freres cigarettes places them in the same class as their affluent Western counterparts. The advertisers portrayed the local smoker in chic surroundings, dressed elegantly and smoking the particular brand, associating wealth with increased cigarette consumption, and fame or celebrity status with smoking their brand.

The success of the advertisers was also obvious in Europe, using an opposite effect. They used the brand's glamorous Oriental mystique, persuading young Western smokers who wanted to boast connections with the exotic Middle East, to buy their brand.

Kyriazi Freres packaging and memorabilia are today sought after by collectors. A Kyriazi Freres cigarette tin box appears in the 2017 movie Blade Runner 2049 at minute 47.15, held by leading man Ryan Gosling ("Officer K").

== Factory ==
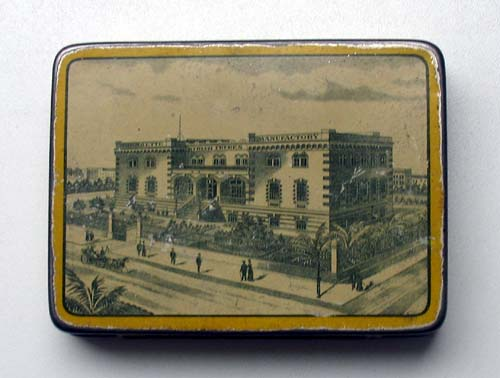
A box with an image of the Kyriazi Freres factory in Cairo

Their original factory was located in a purpose-built building in the European quarter of Cairo, and specifically, in the Souk El Tewfikia. This area was a mix of residential, commercial and diplomatic establishments. The red and beige building and its garden occupied 3000 square meters (32,200 square feet). The Kyriazi Freres factory was, and still is a famous landmark building. The Cairo Times write that "... the place is just as lively today as it was during Kyriazi Pasha's days".

== See also ==
- Egyptian cigarette industry
