= Kypriaka Chronika =

Historical periodical published in Cyprus in 1923–1937

Kypriaka Chronika (Greek: Κυπριακά Χρονικά, "Cypriot Chronicles") was a historical periodical published in Cyprus in 1923–1937, containing details about all aspects of the history of the island. The magazine was established at a time when there were no other periodicals of any kind published in Cyprus, and was a brainchild of a diverse nucleus typical of any intellectual movement: a cleric, a doctor, an industrialist and a professor.

== Origins ==
The publication of Kypriaka Chronica started in January 1923 and was managed by a four-member committee: The Bishop of Kition Nikodemos Mylonas, prof Ioannis Antiphon Sykoutris, Loukis Z. Pierides and Dr Neoclis Kyriazis. A preface quotation by former District Commissioner of Larnaca, Claude Delaval Cobham stated that the aim was "to collect and publish every fragment of written and traditionary lore which can throw light on the history of the Island".

Several subject matters were considered for publication:

1. Original dissertations on philology, history, archaeology, science, economics etc., always with a preference for those relating the most directly to Cyprus.
2. Essays and translations of such dissertations with special reference to Cyprus.
3. Unpublished manuscripts and documents of Cypriot history, inscriptions and other monuments of the past.
4. Unpublished records of the life and language of the Cypriot people of today (traditions, tales, songs, myths, toponyms and folk lore records of every kind.
5. Book reviews and summaries of scientific and philological works, Greek or European.

== Contents ==
The magazine was published in 13 annual volumes as there were no issues in 1928 and 1932. In total there were 4200 pages.

Although the presentation of the material was not scientifically archived, the main aim of the magazine was to salvage, at all costs, material that would otherwise be lost for ever. For this reason, the primary focus was to copy or record any type on information relating to the aims of the magazine, leaving the assessment and the scientific evaluation of the material to future researchers.

The collected material shed light on many unknown aspects of the Cypriot history, including hitherto unknown facts about the island during Byzantine and Ottoman times.

Some subject matters included: Church and religious studies, consulate documents and affairs, financial and commercial events, monasteries and villages of Cyprus, folklore (including medical folklore), archaeology, and information about life on the island, particularly in Larnaca.

Major contributors to the magazine were Neoclis Kyriazis (2680 pages, 64% of the total), Ioannis Sykoutris (319 pages, 7. 6% of the total), and Nikodemos Mylonas (200 pages, 4.8% of the total. Others were L Philippou (171 pages), and Ioannis Peristianis (112 pages), with several others.

== Examples of text ==
1. Superstitions: About three months after death, some people used to break the legs of the corpse so that the dead would not be able to return to earth and take someone else with him/her.

2. Folklore sayings found only in Cyprus:

- Έριξε σίερο (literally "he threw iron"), i.e. "he insisted extremely". From the nautical term "throw ancor", i.e. "stay where you are without changing your position".
- Λύει τον η μίλλα μου (literally "my fat melts him"), i.e. "I feel very sorry for him".
- These and several hundred other popular sayings or slang were recorded and saved from certain extinction from the Cypriot dialect.
