= Zopyrus (physician) =

Greek physician

Zopyrus (Greek: Ζώπυρος; 1st-century BCE) was a surgeon at Alexandria, and the tutor of Apollonius of Citium and Posidonius. He invented an antidote, which he recommended to Mithridates VI of Pontus, and wrote a letter to that king, begging to be allowed to test its efficacy on a criminal. Another somewhat similar composition he prepared for one of the Ptolemies. Some of his medical formulae are quoted and mentioned by various ancient authors, viz. Caelius Aurelianus, Oribasius, Aetius, Paul of Aegina, Marcellus Empiricus, and Nicolaus Myrepsus. Pliny and Dioscorides mention that a certain plant was called zopyron, perhaps after his name. Nicarchus satirizes a physician named Zopyrus in one of his epigrams. Not to be confused with Zopyron.
