= Asclepiades Philophysicus =

Ancient Greek physician

Asclepiades Philophysicus (Ancient Greek: Ἀσκληπιάδης Φιλοφυσικός) was a physician of Ancient Greece who must have lived some time in or before the second century CE, as he is quoted by the physician Galen, who preserved in some of his own works Asclepiades's medical formulae.
