= Antonio Cocchi =

Italian physician and naturalist (1695–1758)

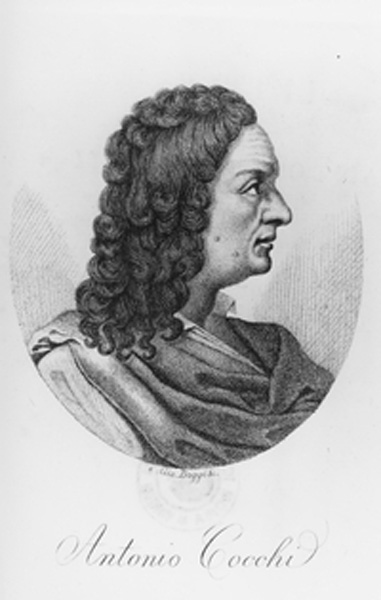
- Born: 3 August 1695; Benevento, Kingdom of Naples
- Died: 1 January 1758 (aged 62)
- Occupations: Physician; naturalist; writer
- Known for: Work on anatomy; early advocacy of vegetarianism

Antonio Cocchi (3 August 1695 – 1 January 1758) was an Italian physician, naturalist and writer. He was best known for his work on anatomy.

== Biography ==
Cocchi was elected a Fellow of the Royal Society in 1736, his candidature citation describing him as "a very noted & Skilfull (sic) Physician at Florence, and formerly Professor of Physic and Philosophy in the University of Pisa, desirous of being elected into this Honourable Society; he is a Gentleman of very distinguished merit both in his profession and all other parts of Natural & Philosophical Learning; he is the Author of Several Books and is now publishing some Greek Medical Writers never before printed from the MSS in the Laurentian Library; he is also at this time Secretary to a Society newly Set up at Florence very much on the Same foot as the Royal Society is here"

Cocchi spent three years in England, where he knew Isaac Newton. Although offered a position by the Princess of Wales, he returned to teach in Tuscany.

Cocci was also a classical scholar, producing the first edition of the Ephesian Tale, a novel by Xenophon of Ephesus, as well as other work on Greek romances. His Discorso primo sopra Asclepiade (1758), on Asclepiades of Bithynia, appeared also in his collected Opere (1824). Elizabeth Rawson called the Discorso "learned and often penetrating, though over-enthusiastic about his subject's moral virtues."

Cocchi's writing style was characterised by purity of diction, and in his own time was regarded as a model for scientific writing.

== Vegetarianism ==
Cocchi was a vegetarian and was influenced by Pythagoras. He authored the book Del vitto pitagorico per uso della medicina in 1743. It was translated by Robert Dodsley into English as The Pythagorean Diet in 1745. Voltaire admired the book.

Cocchi documented the health benefits of a vegetable diet. He was the first to argue that scurvy may occur from lack of vegetables in the diet.

== Selected publications ==
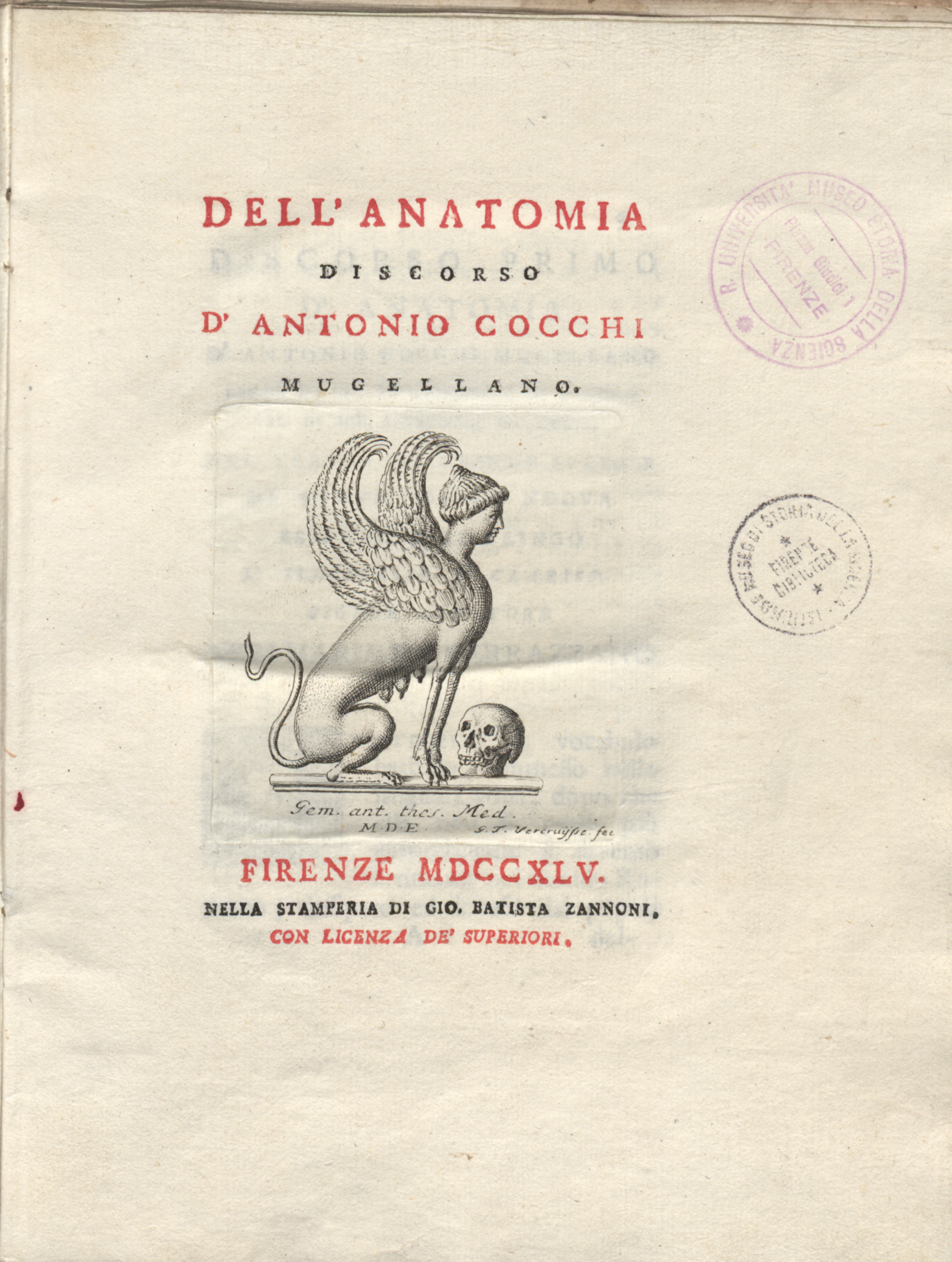
Dell'anatomia, 1745

- Del vitto pitagorico per uso della medicina (1743)
- Dell'anatomia. Firenze: Giovanni Battista Zannoni. 1745.
- Du Regime De Vivre Pythagoricien à l'usage de la Médecine (1750)
- Consulti medici. Vol. 2. In Bergamo: Vincenzo Antoine. 1791.
- The Life of Asclepiades, London: T. Davies, 1762.
