= Asclepiades Mendes =

Ancient Greek historian

Asclepiades (Ancient Greek: Ἀσκληπιάδης) was a writer of ancient Egypt who possessed, according to the Suda, a profound knowledge of Ancient Egyptian religion, and wrote hymns on his native gods.

He also composed a work upon the agreement among the different religions, Synthesis of All Theologies (τῶν θεολογιῶν ἁπασῶν ἡ συμφωνία), a second on the history of Egypt, and a third on the mythological ruler Ogyges. The sixtieth book of his history of Egypt is quoted by the grammarian Athenaeus.

Many scholars believe that this Asclepiades is the same as the one whom the historian Suetonius calls the author of Theologizing (Θεολογούμενα) and of whom he quotes a fragment. This work seems like it might be the same as Synthesis of All Theologies.

Suetonius calls him "Asclepiades Mendes" which seems to be a toponymic surname derived from the name of a town in Egypt.
