= Asclepiades of Alexandria =

Ancient Greek Grammarian

Asclepiades (Ancient Greek: Ἀσκληπιάδης) of Alexandria seems to have been a grammarian, as the Scholiast on Aristophanes quotes him as an authority on the meaning of the word demarchos (δήμαρχος). Of his time we know only that he lived in or after the 5th century BCE.
