= Asclepiades of Myrlea =

Ancient Greek philologist

Asclepiades of Myrlea (Greek: Ἀσκληπιάδης ὁ Μυρλεανός) was a Greek grammarian, historian and astronomer disciple of Apollonius of Rhodes born in Myrlea (Bithynia) that lived in the 2nd and 1st centuries BC. At the time of Pompey he was a teacher in Rome. He lived for some time in Spain teaching grammar in Turdetania.

== Work ==
Of his numerous Greek writings only some fragments remain which include information about Bithynia as well as some Turdetan myths, collected by the Greek historian Pompeius Trogus.

There is some debate about whether this Asclepiades is the same person as the Asclepiades, son of Areius, who wrote a work on Demetrius Phalereus.

== Bibliography ==
- Smith, William (1867). Dictionary of Greek and Roman Biography and Mythology. Boston: Little, Brown and Co. p. 381.
- Pagani, Lara (2007). Pleiadi Edizioni di storia e letteratura (ed.). Asclepiades of Bithynia: I frammenti degli scritti omerici.
- Brill's Companion to Ancient Greek Scholarship (2 Vols.). Brill. 2015. ISBN 9789004281929.
