= Asclepiades of Cyprus =

Ancient Greek historian

Asclepiades (Ancient Greek: Ἀσκληπιάδης) of Cyprus was a historian of ancient Greece, who wrote a work on the history of his native island and Phoenicia, of which a fragment is preserved by the philosopher Porphyry. Some scholars have suggested that he was Phoenician instead of Cyprian. He also wrote about Alexander the Great. He may have lived in or around the 3rd century BCE.
