= Asclepiades Titiensis =

Ancient Greek physician

Asclepiades (Ancient Greek: Ἀσκληπιάδης) Titiensis or Citiensis was a physician of Ancient Greece who must have lived in or before the second century CE, as he is quoted by the Greco-Roman medical writer Caelius Aurelianus at that time. Caelius describes him as an authority regarding his pre-eminence in identifying apoplexy with paralysis.

While this name is rendered "Titiensis" in many of the early editions of Caelius's work, it has been suggested his name was originally "Citiensis", and that "Titiensis" was an error introduced by an earlier copyist. Later editions are split whether to call him "Titiensis" or "Citiensis".

Some scholars such as Daniel Le Clerc were doubtful this Asclepiades was distinct from all of the other obscure ancient physicians who shared this name. He may be the same person as Apollonios of Kition.
