= Asclepiades of Bithynia =

1st-century BC Greek physician

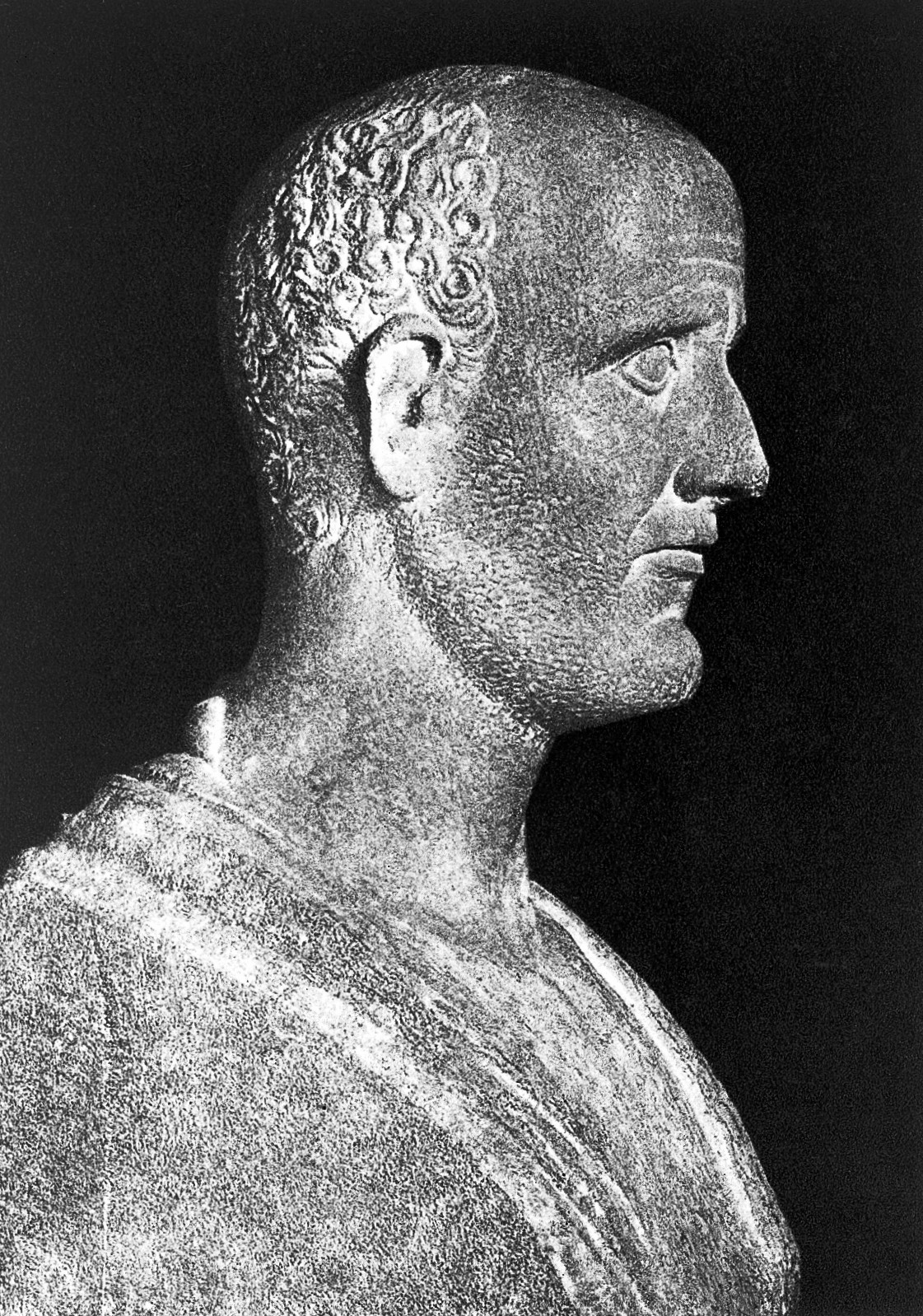
Bust of Asclepiades

Asclepiades (Greek: Ἀσκληπιάδης; c. 129/124 BC – 40 BC), sometimes called Asclepiades of Bithynia or Asclepiades of Prusa, was a Greek physician born at Prusias-on-Sea in Bithynia in Anatolia and who flourished at Rome, where he practised and taught Greek medicine. He attempted to build a new theory of disease, based on the flow of "atoms" through pores in the body. His treatments sought to restore harmony through the use of diet, exercise, and bathing.

Biographer Antonio Cocchi noted that there were over forty men of history with the name Asclepiades and wrote that physician Caius Calpurnius Asclepiades of Prusa, born 88 CE, was a fellow countryman of, and perhaps a direct descendant of this Asclepiades.

== Life ==
Asclepiades was born in Prusias-on-Sea in Bithynia. He traveled extensively when young, and seems at first to have settled in Rome to work as a rhetorician. In that profession, he did not succeed, but he acquired a great reputation as a physician. His pupils were very numerous, and his most distinguished pupil, Themison of Laodicea, founded the Methodic school. It is not known specifically when he died, except that it was at an advanced age. It was said that he laid a wager with Fortune, that he would forfeit his character as a physician if he should ever suffer from any disease himself. Pliny the Elder, who tells the anecdote, adds that he won his wager, dying from an accident. Nothing remains of his writings but a few fragments.

The family lineage of Asclepiades is not known. It is assumed that his father was a doctor due to ancient physicians coming from medical families. He received the names Philosophicus due to his knowledge of philosophy and Pharmacion for his knowledge of medicinal herbs. Antiochus of Ascalon said about Asclepiades, "second to none in the art of medicine and acquainted with philosophy too."

== Medicine ==
Asclepiades began by vilifying the principles and practices of his predecessors, and by asserting that he had discovered a more effective method of treating diseases than had been before known to the world. He decried the efforts of those who sought to investigate the structure of the body, or to watch the phenomena of disease, and he is said to have directed his attacks, particularly, against the writings of Hippocrates.

Discarding the humoral doctrine of Hippocrates, Asclepiades attempted to build a new theory of disease, and founded his medical practice on a modification of the atomic or corpuscular theory, according to which disease results from irregular or inharmonious motion of the corpuscles of the body. His ideas were likely partly derived from the atomic theories of Democritus and Epicurus. All morbid action was reduced to the obstruction of pores and irregular distribution of atoms. Asclepiades arranged diseases into two great classes: Acute and Chronic. Acute diseases were caused essentially by a constriction of the pores or an obstruction of them by an excess of atoms; Chronic diseases were caused by a relaxation of the pores or a deficiency of atoms. Asclepiades thought that other mild diseases were caused by a disruption in bodily fluids and pneuma. He separated illnesses into three separate categories: status strictus (too tightly held), status laxus (too loosely held), and status mixtus (a little of each). He also believed that there were no critical days of diseases, meaning that illnesses do not end at a definite time.

Asclepiades' remedies were, therefore, directed to the restoration of harmony. He trusted much to changes in diet, massages, bathing and exercise, although he did employ emetics and bleeding. A part of the great popularity which he enjoyed depended upon his prescribing the liberal use of wine to his patients, and upon his attending to their every need, and indulging their inclinations. He would treat all his patients fairly and did not discriminate based on gender or mental illness. He believed treating his patients kindly and amicably was essential to being a good physician. Cito tuto jucunde (meaning to treat his patients "swiftly, safely, and sweetly") was a motto that he followed. This contrasted with the behavior of other physicians who practiced during his lifetime and of whom it was said had a tendency to be uncaring and unsympathetic towards their patients.

=== Drug theory ===
Digestion was a primary factor in Asclepiades' drug theory. Particles of food were seen as the main cause of indigestion. If the particles of food were small, digestion would follow its normal course. However, if the particles were too big, indigestion would occur. If an illness were to occur, he believed that drugs were not the solution. His prescribed treatment was food and wine (given in appropriate amounts) followed by an enema, which would extract the improper food doing the damage. This procedure would remove the cause of illness. Asclepiades believed that the use of drugs for cleansing was of no use - "all the substances were produced by the drugs themselves", but, rather, "Treatment consists merely of three elements: drink, food and the enema".

Asclepiades was heavily influenced by Pythagoreanism and the early work of Democritus on herbal powers and remedies. Pliny the Elder says of him, “Above all, he was helped by magean deceits, which prevailed to such a degree that they were strong enough to destroy confidence in all herbal remedies” and goes on to detail some of the magic powers of those plants, including two previously detailed by Democritus.

=== Music therapy ===
Asclepiades used music therapy to treat mentally ill patients in order to maintain "psychogenic equilibrium". While Asclepiades was not the first to use music therapy, he used it to treat mental illness along with other ailments including viper bites and scorpion stings. Gentle music was recommended to those in a flippant state, while those in a somber state were encouraged with music using the Phrygian mode. He did not recommend the use of a flute in any treatments because it was considered to be too energetic and would not have a calming effect on patients. He believed that the part of the body that was affected would dance to the music and expel the pain from the body.

The medical writers Galen and Aretaeus, both of whom lived in the 2nd century AD, credited Asclepiades with being the first individual to perform an elective (non-emergency) tracheotomy.

Asclepiades advocated humane treatment of mental disorders and had insane persons freed from confinement and treated them with natural therapy, such as diet and massages. Asclepiades is considered to be a pioneer physician in psychotherapy, physical therapy, and molecular medicine.
