= Apollonios of Kition =

Apollonios of Kition (or Apollonius of Citium; Greek: Ἀπολλώνιος ὁ Κιτιεύς), was a physician (fl. c. 60 BC) belonging to the Empiric school of thought. He studied medicine in Alexandria under the surgeon Zopyrus, but he lived in Kition (now Larnaca). Another theory is that he studied medicine in Kition although it is not clear whether a medical school existed at the time.

It has been suggested by some scholars that this physician is the same person as Asclepiades Titiensis.

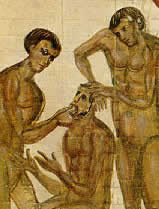
Drawing from the book Περὶ Ἄρθρων ("On Joints"). Apollonios is believed to be the main operator.

== Background ==
The fame of Apollonios was spread all over the ancient Greek world, and he was considered to be the most important of all Cypriot physicians. The medical opinions of Apollonios were considered valid and authentic according to Erotianus. Important personalities such as Strabo, Cicero and Pedanius Dioscorides have also written positive comments on Apollonios. Although primarily a physician, Apollonios had an interest in surgery and trauma.

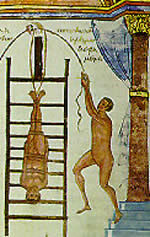
From 'Peri Arthron'. Treatment for dislocation

== Books ==
Apollonios wrote several books on medicine but his most important (and the one that survived) is Peri Arthron (On Joints, Greek: Περὶ Ἄρθρων) which is a study of the teachings of Hippocrates on the subject. This book was written in Cyprus. A copy of this work was found in the library of the Byzantine doctor Nikitas, and it is now kept in Florence. The book was written under the patronage of the king Ptolemaius (Ptolemy of Cyprus) c. 81-58 BC. The treatise is a gift presentation to the king and belongs to the genre of court science treatises of the Hellenistic age. It is divided into three sections written at different times. The first part discusses the dislocations of the shoulder; the second discusses those of the elbow, wrist, jaw and spine, whereas the third and final part discusses the dislocations of the lower limbs. The book includes 30 hand-painted pictures, believed to be copies made from the original book written by Hippocrates himself.

It is believed that he wrote a book on epilepsy (On Epileptics). This has not survived. Herodian mentions that Apollonios wrote (or co-authored) a total of 21 books. Some of these were studies on the adverse effects of alcohol, elaborating on the type of voice produced during drunkenness. One of the books was on general therapy (curationes).

== Modern legacy ==
Many modern students of Ancient Greek and Cypriot medical history have written about Apollonios. Larnaca Municipality has given his name to a street, and more recently, has dedicated a statue in a main square of the town. The hand-painted drawings of Apollonios from his books on joints have been exhibited in a variety of medical and historical exhibitions. The Laurentian Library in Florence where the original manuscript is housed has agreed to allow the removal of the manuscript for the purposes of exhibition, only on very rare occasions.

In May 2013 the Kyriazis Medical Museum in Larnaca organised a major event celebrating the 2000 years since Apollonios' death.
