= Asclepius (grammarian) =

Ancient Greek grammarian

Asclepius (Ancient Greek: Ἀσκλήπιος) was a Greek grammarian of uncertain date, who wrote commentaries upon the orations of Demosthenes and the history of Thucydides. Both works are now lost.
