= Kissos =

Kissos Κισσός
- Community

- Location within Greece
- Coordinates: 39°24′N 23°8′E
- Country: Greece
- Administrative region: Thessaly
- Regional unit: Magnesia
- Municipality: Zagora-Mouresi
- Municipal unit: Mouresi
- Elevation: 500 m (1,600 ft)

Population (2021)
  - Community: 254
- Time zone: UTC+2 (EET)
  - Summer (DST): UTC+3 (EEST)
- Vehicle registration: ΒΟ

Kissos (Greek: Κισσός) is a mountain village in the municipal unit of Mouresi, in the eastern part of Magnesia, Greece. It sits on the eastern slopes of the forested Pelion mountains, at about 500 meters elevation, 3 km from the Aegean Sea to the northeast. It is located 3 km west of Mouresi, 5 km southeast of Zagora and 17 km east of the city of Volos (Magnesia's capital).

Kissos was the original home of Kyriazis Hadji-Kyriazis (b. 1817), founder of the dynasty of tobacco merchants and producers which eventually got to great prominence in Egypt as "Kyriazi freres".

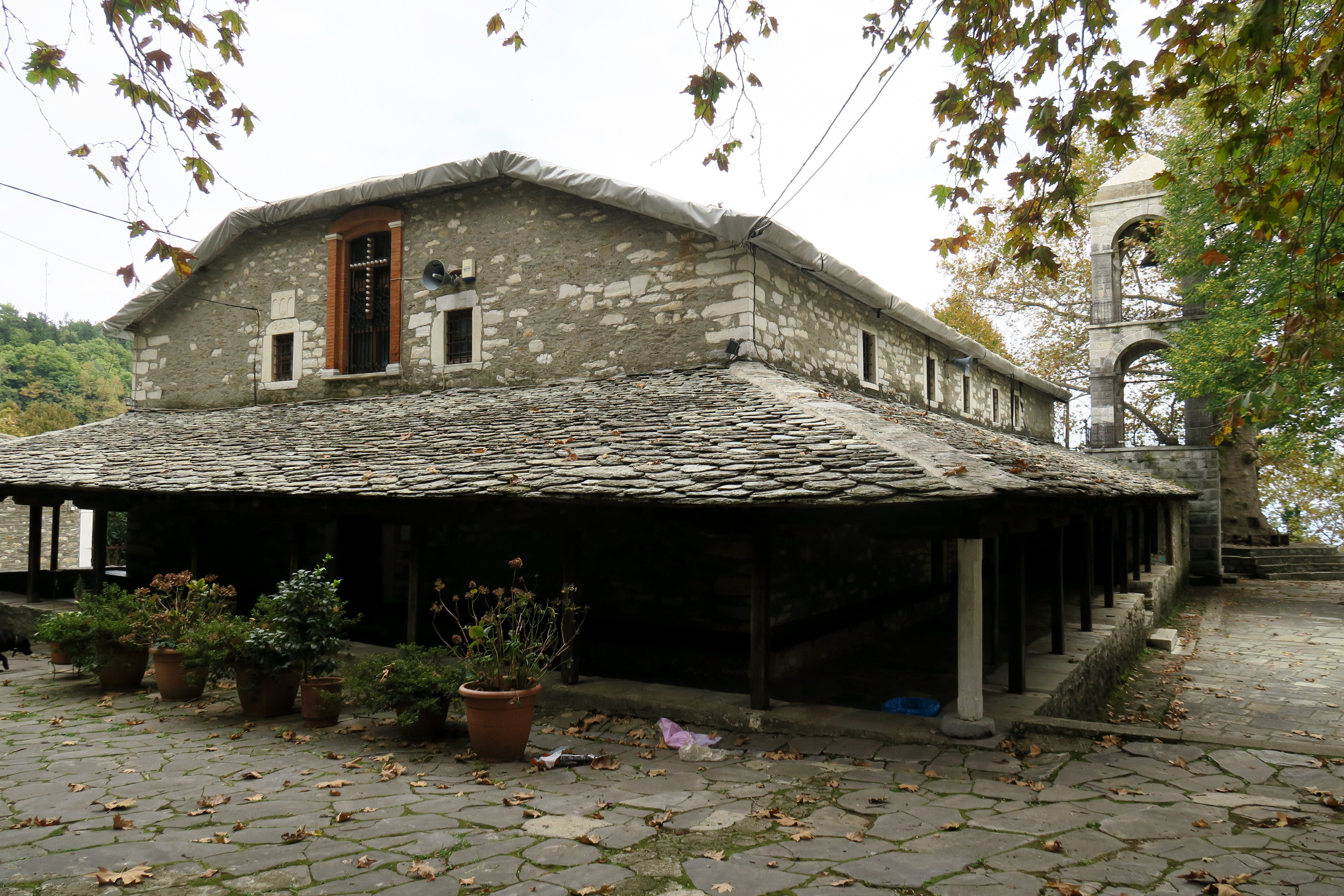
Church of Agia Marina

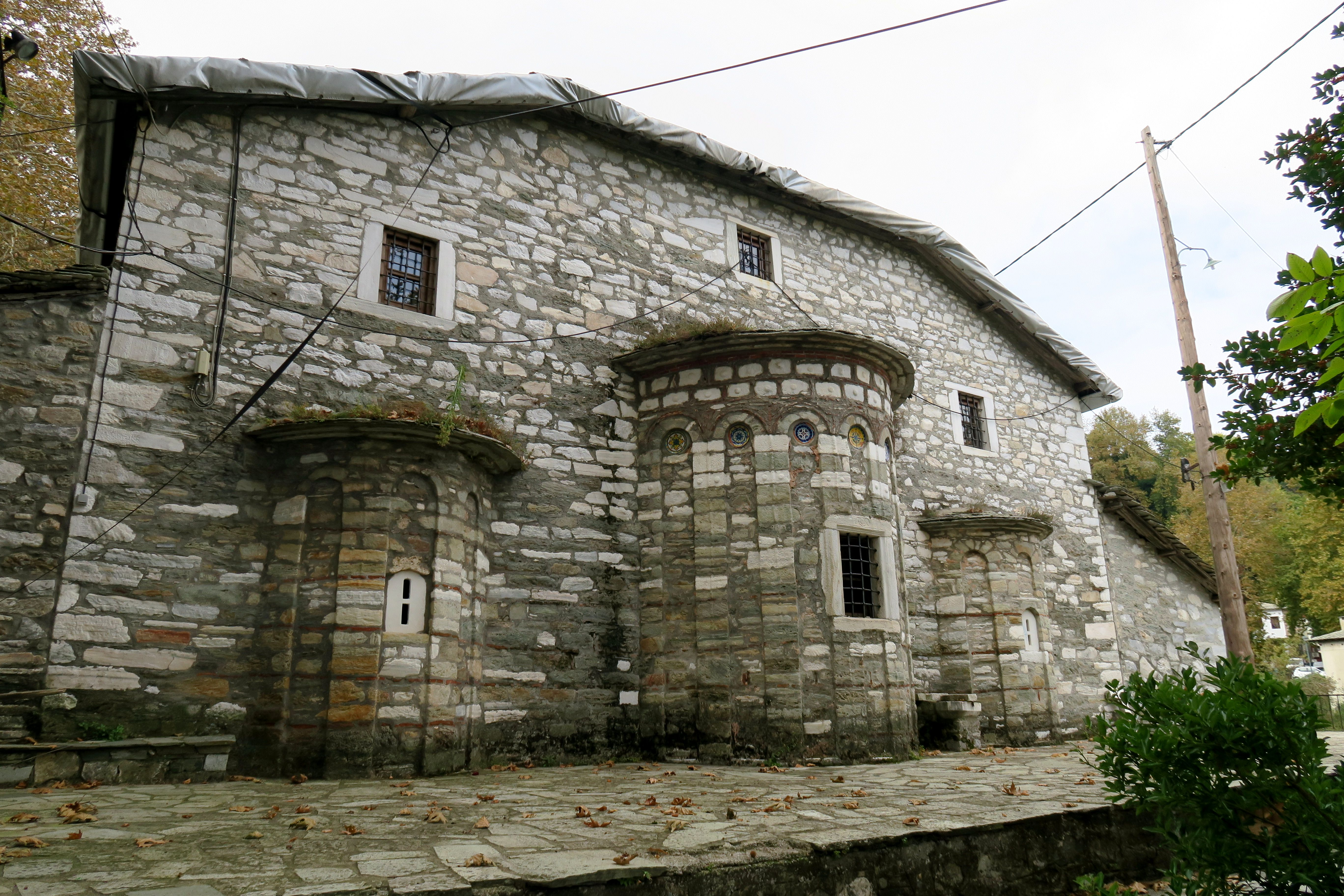
Church of Agia Marina - rear view

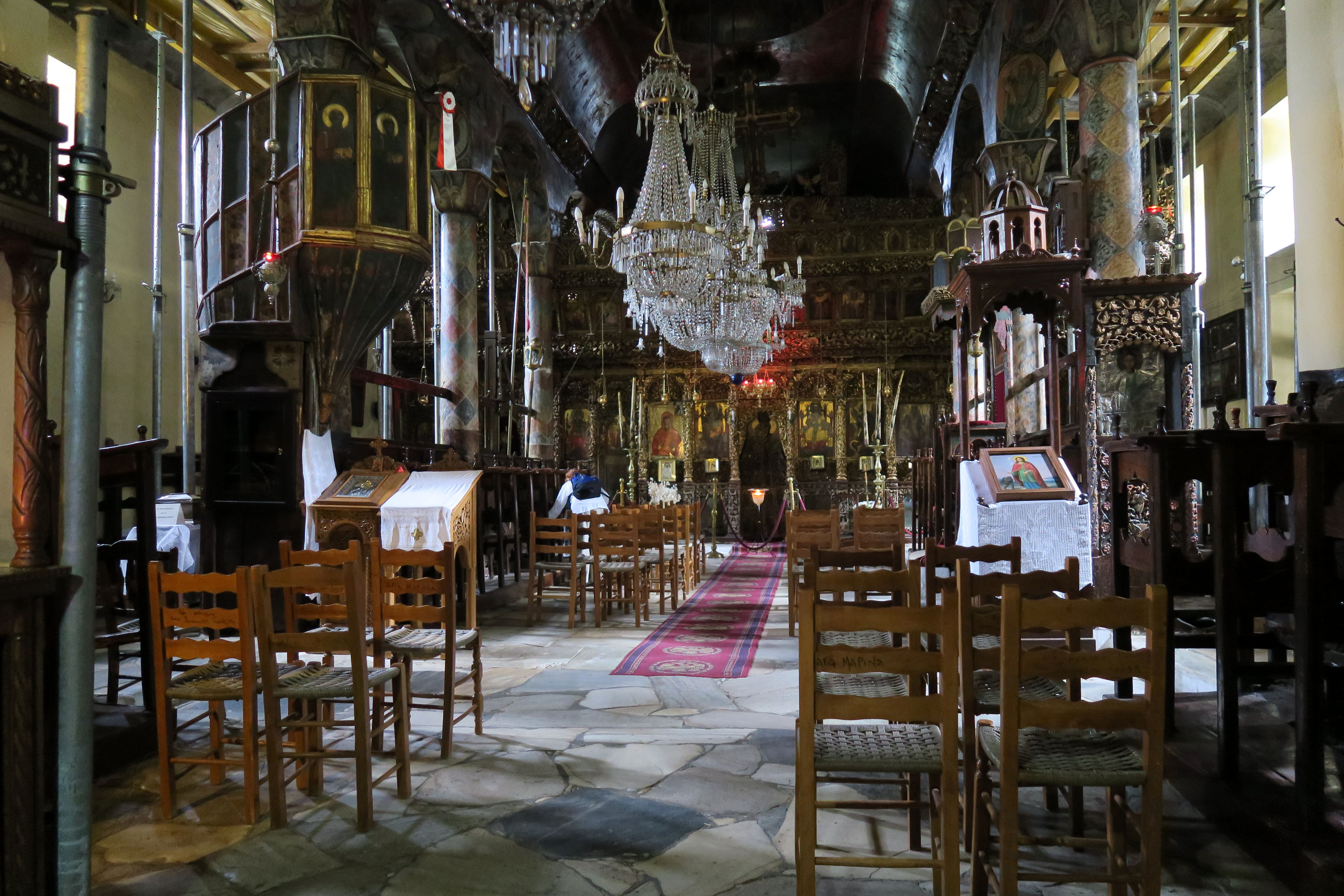
Church of Agia Marina

The church of Agia Marina, which dates back to the 17th century, is located in Kissos. The church was built in 1650 during the Turkish occupation of Greece. The size of the church and the fact that it was built in the main square of the village suggest that the church was built with the permission of the Turks. The church is beautifully decorated inside with frescoes and wooden carved iconostases.

The village is also the site of the Ecclesiastic Museum of Aghia Marina.

== Population ==
Historical population
Year	Pop.	±%
1981	430	—
1991	467	+8.6%
2001	390	−16.5%
2011	332	−14.9%
2021	254	−23.5%

== See also ==
- List of settlements in the Magnesia regional unit
