= Isaac Hollister Hall =

American Orientalist (1837–1896)

Isaac Hollister Hall (December 12, 1837 – July 2, 1896) was an American Orientalist.

== Biography ==
He was born in Norwalk, Connecticut. He graduated at Hamilton College in 1859, was a tutor there in 1859–1863, graduated from Columbia Law School in 1865, practised law in New York City until 1875, and, during 1875–1877, taught in the Syrian Protestant College at Beirut, where he discovered a valuable Syriac manuscript of the Philoxenian version of a large part of the New Testament, which he published in part in facsimile in 1884.

He worked with General di Cesnola in classifying the famous Cypriote collection in the Metropolitan Museum of New York City, and was a curator of that museum from 1885 until his death in Mount Vernon, New York, on 2 July 1896.

== Work ==
Hall was an eminent authority on Oriental inscriptions. Following the scanty clues given by George Smith and Samuel Birch, and working on the data furnished by the di Cesnola collection, he succeeded about 1874 in deciphering an entire Cypriote inscription, and in establishing the Hellenic character of the dialect and the syllabic nature of the script.

=== Selected works ===
- Article on Cypriote epigraphy in Scribner's Magazine 20 (June 1880): 205–211
- "Cypriote Inscriptions of the Di Cesnola Collection in the Metropolitan Museum of Art, in New York City." Journal of the American Oriental Society 10 (1875): 201–18
- with Frank Stockton Dobbins and Samuel Wells Williams, False Gods: Or, the Idol Worship of the World. A Complete History of Idolatrous Worship Throughout the World, Ancient and Modern. Describing the Strange Beliefs, Practices, Superstitions, Temples, Idols, Shrines, Sacrifices, Domestic Peculiarities, Etc., Etc., Connected Therewith. Philadelphia, 1881
- American Greek Testaments: A Critical Bibliography of the Greek New Testament as Published in America. Philadelphia, 1883
- with Frank Stockton Dobbins and Samuel Wells Williams. Error’s Chains: How Forged and Broke. A Complete, Graphic, and Comparative History of the Many Strange Beliefs, Superstitious Practices, Domestic Peculiarities, Sacred Writings, Systems of Philosophy, Legends and Traditions, Customs and Habits of Mankind Throughout the World, Ancient and Modern. New York, 1883
- Williams Manuscript: The Syrian Antilegomena Epistles. Baltimore, 1886. (Facsimile)
- with Frank Stockton Dobbins and Samuel Wells Williams. Gods and Devils of Mankind. Philadelphia, 1897
