= History of medicine in Cyprus =

Cyprus

The practice of medicine and therapeutics in Cyprus has its roots into ancient times. Many of the classical practices were well documented at the time by Greek or Roman physicians, and some therapies have originated from Cyprus itself.

== Primitive medicine ==
Medical practice in ancient Cyprus is believed to reflect general medical principles from Ancient Greece and the Middle East. Local doctors were commonly using frankincense, myrrh, olive oil, resins from trees, wormwood, bitter herbs in water, and mandrake. Trepanning of the skull was also in use (a technique used since 10000 BC. This was thought to release the ‘bad spirits’ and was used in epilepsy, headaches and head injuries. They used a famous ‘poultice of figs’ to cure boils and the local healers had a concept of cleaning, washing and disinfecting the water. Common diseases in Cyprus were those in every Mediterranean country, namely food poisoning, sun stroke, tuberculosis and polio. Drought affected the water supplies making the water poisonous. Other common diseases were leprosy, skin infections, boils, eye infections (due to dust and flies), fractures and injuries. Epidemics such as bubonic plague were common. Many believed that healing was possible by believing in God, and the healers used special rituals, charms and incantations. The sick were looked after in local sanctuaries, under the care of priests.

The Myceneans (c1500 BC) believed that any god could cause a disease. Apollo and Artemis could shoot arrows to cause diseases, whereas other gods could cause ageing. They believed that Thymos was the life force present in all living organisms, Psyche was the soul, and the heart was where consciousness was located. They knew that the heart is a beating organ, and that the throat carried food to the stomach. Medicine was practiced by healers, who treated wounds in battle, and by the Physicians, who treated any other disease. Their position in the society was lower than nobility and higher than craftsmen. They used a variety of surgical instruments, as well as medicinal plants and ointments.

== Phoenicians (900–800 BC) ==
The Phoenician goddess of pregnancy was Astarte (also called Astoreth), goddess of fertility, nutrition and gynaecology, identified with Aphrodite. Astarte was worshipped in Kition (present day Larnaca). She was married to the Middle Eastern god Baal who was also worshipped in Kition. Bronze snakes (medical symbols) were found near where their temple was believed to be. It is known that during the 5th century BC, the Phoenicians were making false teeth. Doctors were making the drugs themselves and had fixed charges for each drug. Several inscriptions referring to Apollo Amyklos, the god of healing, were found mainly near Kition. A doctor mentioned by name was Onasilaos. He was a military doctor living in Idalhion (present day Dali village). Together with his two brothers, probably male nurses, treated the injured in a battle against the Medes. Originally the Cypriots were vegetarians consuming no meat at all, as it was forbidden to sacrifice living animals. With time, they began sacrificing living animals, believing in the concept of ‘a soul for a soul’ (psychi anti psychis), and burned the animal after the sacrifice. According to legend, during a sacrificial burning one day, a piece of flesh accidentally fell on the floor and the priest picked it up quickly and put it back on the altar, but he burned his fingers in the process. He put his fingers in his mouth instinctively to soothe the burn. He liked the taste of the juices and he then decided to eat the meat. He was punished for this, but others followed in his steps and eventually the Cypriots became meat eaters.

== Greeks (460–357 BC) ==
The vaginal speculum was first used in ancient Greece and some contemporary specula were found in Cyprus. A pure gold otoscope, very similar to those commonly used in the 1930s was also found. A known doctor of the period was Diagoras the Cypriot (3rd century BC). He was mentioned by Dioscorides with regards to opium use, also by Pliny, and Erotianus. Diagoras was famous outside Cyprus. He was specifically interested in pharmacology and he devised the ‘Great Collirio’ used for burns, exophthalmos, keratitis, eye ache (ponommatos), and discharge from the eye. The Collirio was also used to cure headache, with the addition of opium into the mixture. In the Cyprus Museum in Nicosia there is a stone ring with the inscription 'Diagorou', and the head of the Medusa. According to legend, Athena gave to Asclepius the blood from the Medusa, believed to have healing properties.

Material used by Greek physicians:

- Honey, which is antibacterial. It works because it is hypertonic, so it draws water from the bacteria. Honey contains inhibine which is involved in a reaction producing hydrogen peroxide (antiseptic), and contains propolis with known antibacterial activity.
- Fat used as antibacterial, also for making ointments
- The white milk of figs, used for coagulation - to stop hemorrhage
- Frankincense (Livani), is an antiseptic
- Zinc (abundant in Cyprus) was heated to produce zinc carbonate and zinc hydro silicate called Cadmian Earth, and stirred with reed (kalami) to make "calamine" lotion. This, as today, is used for treating wounds, drying wet skin, ulcers and general skin antiseptic.
- Vinegar, as acetic acid, is an antiseptic, also active against pseudomonas
- Dung used as wound healer, as it contains anti-inflammatory enzymes
- Myrrh was used on wounds, for enema, on burns. It is bacteriostatic against Gram positive bacteria
- Theriac, contains opium and snake flesh, was used for many ailments including snake bites
- Wine, kills Vibrio cholerae, Escherichia coli, Salmonella typhi, staphylococcus, Streptococcus, Proteus, and Pseudomonas. It contains alcohol and anthocyanidins. It was used generously because its power is short-lived.
- Rust from oxidized iron was used to cure wounds, and in water, against anaemia
- Terminthos (trimithia) helped in urinary problems, against indigestion, and in hair loss
- Kalamos (kalami) (arundo donax) its roots were used for pain and its green leaves as anti-inflammatory. The outside shell mixed with vinegar was used for alopecia
- Fragrant plants (mint, lavender, bay leaves) were used as antiseptics
- Melanthion (mavrokoccos) (nigella sativa) was used to improve the appetite and for stomach problems, as well as for neuralgias and pain, urinary problems and insect bites. Apollo Melanthios, also called Opaon Melanthios, was worshipped all over Cyprus
- Salt (from the local salt lakes). Pliny wrote: "the salt of Kitium is very good..." Salt was used for cleaning wounds and stopping hemorrhage, insect or snake bites, fungal infections. This was used both in antiquity and in contemporary popular medicine.

== Ancient Cypriot Doctors ==
Apollodoros of Kition, recommended radish seeds in water against poisoning. He wrote 'Peri Myron Ke Stefanon' (On Perfumes and Wreaths) where he recommended rose wreaths for headaches. He also wrote 'Peri Thirion' (On Beasts). Pliny and Dioscorides wrote extensively about him, praising his abilities. Synesis the Cypriot (4th century BC) mentioned by Aristotle, must have been famous. He was also mentioned as Synesios.

The most famous doctor of the time was Apollonios of Kition (1st century BC). He was known as the Cypriot Hippocrates and wrote many medical books. His most well known was ‘On Joints’ (Peri Arthron), comments on treatment of joint injuries, based on Hippocrates. Zeno of Cyprus (361 AD) founded a medical school in Alexandria. His student was Oribasius. The Emperor Julian wrote: ‘... you are not an ordinary doctor, but a teacher also’. He was very experienced both in the theory and practice of medicine. He wrote many books, none of which has survived. Other doctors were: Apollonides, Onasilaos, Oktaousios, Ktisias Knidios, Paion of Amathus, Leonidas Skythinou, Nouminios Solevs, Phedas Damassagorou

== Byzantines ==
The influence of Byzantion in Cyprus lasted from 647 AD to 1191 AD. Byzantine medicine was based on common sense rather than scientific ideas. Byzantine physicians supported Christian philanthropy, with development of hospitals and organisations (nosokomeia, xenones), for the first time in medical history. They offered treatment to all patients regardless of social or economic position.

During this period there was an increasing reliance on cures by Saints. Traditional medicine (iatrosofia) becomes established. Examples of treatments are: santalon (a light stone) is used for mumps, boils and tonsillitis. They rubbed it on a wet clay pot (couza), and spread the resulting mud on the boil. For earache they used warm olive oil and for trachoma they washed the eyes with urine or sambuca. The mammouthes (practical nurses) assisted during childbirth, and also used cupping (cazia) and venesection (vlotomes). A local proverb for those who react excessively to a small problem, is "apou poni vathkia vlootoma" (he who has pain, venesects deeply). Also mentioned was a Byzantine trick: "In order to seduce a man put a few drops of menstrual blood in his coffee."

== Lusignians (1192-1473) ==
Doctors were allowed to practice only after permission from bishops and other more senior doctors. Ignorance and malpractice where punished, sometimes by death. The Lusignians used affumications, herbs, astrology, venesections, cautery, purging, and pilgrimages to the saints. A surgeon was locally called 'surgentis', the hospital 'spitalli' and the midwives 'mammouthes', who also performed virginity examinations. A medical doctor was called ‘doctor of physic’ as opposed to a surgeon. The chemist was called 'myropsios'. Mastre (Magistro) was a title given to doctors, as well as to chief musicians (hence ‘Maestro’), chief builders (hence ‘Master’) and army officials.

A physician known as Mastre Gky (c1300), was probably Dr Guido de Pagnolo, an Italian living in Cyprus and personal friend of Petrarch. King Pier I of France sent Mastre Gky to Genoa as an emissary to mediate and try to find a compromise on several political issues between the Genoese and Franks. He was successful and he was said to have achieved 'real and firm' cooperation. This indicates that some doctors had heavy political involvement in the government. Other doctors were Mastre Pier Vryonas, Mastre Gabriel Zintilis, and Mastre Synglitikos, all believed to be of Greek Cypriot origin. Curing saints were very in demand, particularly by the lower social classes. The higher classes paid for qualified doctors. For example, The historian Macheras says that St Mamas is 'miraculous all over the world, and if I was going to write about his cures, I wouldn't be able to do it while alive". Other saints were thought to cure fever, malaria, sciatica etc. Examples of epidemics:

- 1348 Epidemic (plague?). "God sent a great death because we are sinners, half of the island died".
- 1409 Great epidemic (‘Mega Thanatico’)
- 1470 Plague, lasted three years and killed 75% of the inhabitants.

== Venetians (1489-1570) ==
Cyprus depended on the ‘Consiglio Maggiore di Venezia’. The government paid the salary of some doctors, whereas others were private. There were doctors, midwives and practical doctors, who were practicing venesection, cautery, purging, and sniffing. Two doctors are mentioned by name: Bulien de Nores from a baronial family, and Jane de Rames (1489–1571). The latter was born in Cyprus but also lived and practised in Padua. The local Cypriots requested a doctor from Venice and he was sent by the Venetian government. His salary was 300 ducats a year, quite high for a doctor. In general, the Christian doctors were better paid than the Jews.

== Turks (1571-1878) ==
In Cyprus there were too many sick people due to the frequent malaria epidemics, and too few doctors. Qualified doctors were working well and paid well. In addition, doctors were selling drugs for extra income. The first doctor of that period was Aloise Cucci (1625). He was an Italian who lived in Cyprus, a well-informed and wise doctor. There were many others mentioned by name, both Cypriot and French. Examples are:

Dr Dimanel and Dr Dende (c1705) were ‘Docteurs de Nation Française’. They were recorded in certificates in from the French embassy in Cyprus. Dr Guerin and Dr Donde (c1730) were surgeons who prepared a perfumed concoction to disinfect the house when somebody died. Xatzi Georgios X Liasi Chalepli 1742 was a Cypriot, born in Beirut, but lived and practiced in Larnaca.

Dr Gerolamo Varlamo (Varlaam) (1770) had the qualification ‘Dottore Veneto di Medicina’. From Venice he came to Cyprus through Corfu. He studied in Padova. Drs Giuseppe Zambelli and Francesco A Patriarca (1794), from Naples, were working in Famagusta and then in Larnaca. They had a written agreement to work together as partners in medicine and surgery, and to share the income for 10 years.

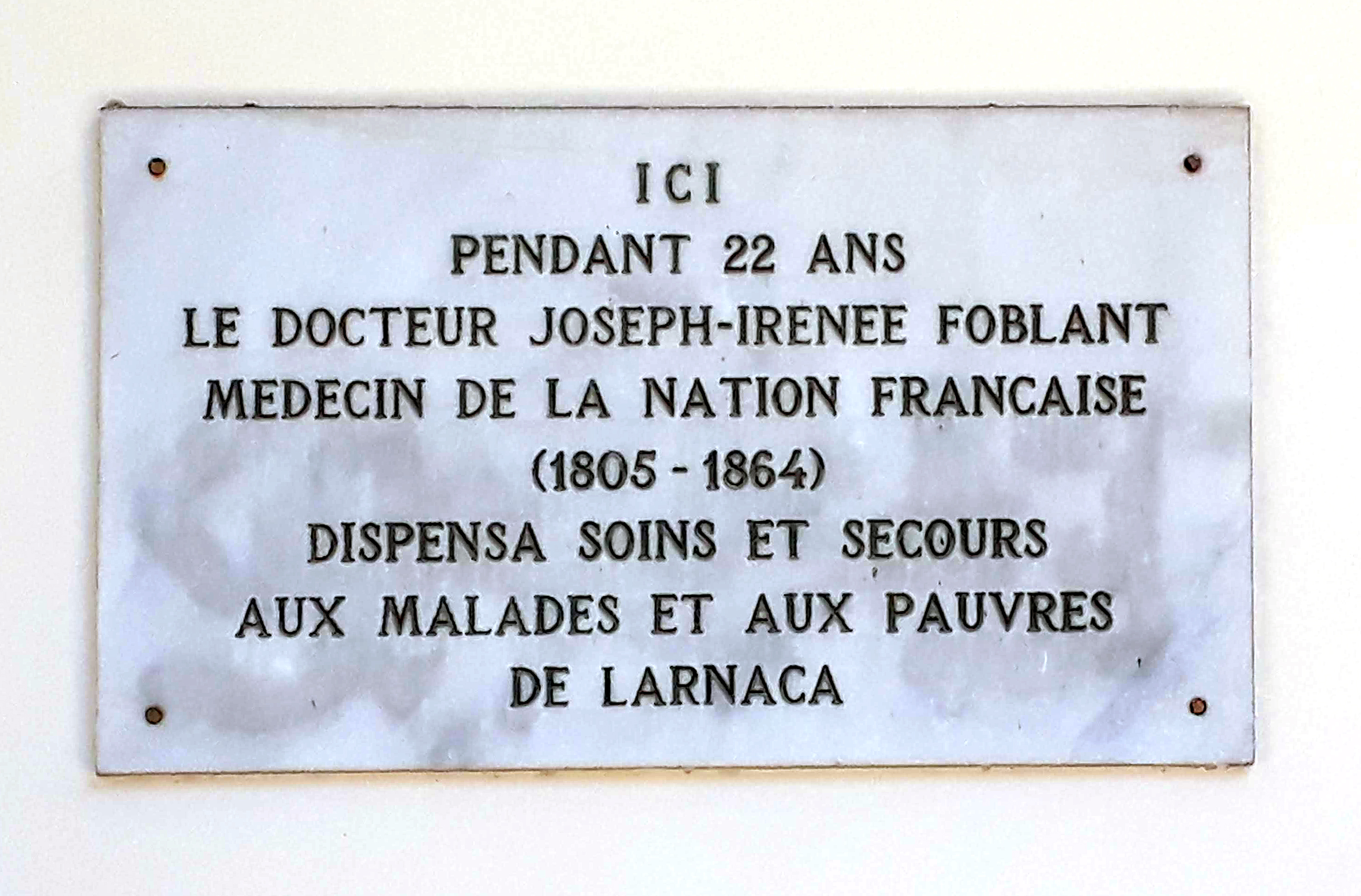
Memorial plate Dr Foblant at St. Joseph's Convent in Larnaca

Dr Kostandinos Valsamaki (Varsamas) (1779) He was a descendant of Balsamina Doukaina, Iakobos Gabras, Alexandros Tsaphas Argyros. was married to the daughter of Dr Vondiziano. He studied in Padova. His son Pavlos was also a doctor and was charging 8 piastres for a home visit, and 18 for a consultation with other doctors. Was the first community physician in 1837. Their descendants moved to Greece. Dr Oben (Aubin, 1817) a Frenchman. He was requesting to become ‘Officier de Santé de la Nation Française’ i.e. government doctor. It is recorded that he diagnosed the plague on a patient, who also had anthrax. Christoforo Castellani (1821) was an Italian, private physician to Kutchuk Mehmet, Governor of Cyprus. The French Dr Joseph Irene Foblant 1839 was said that he used to put a coin under the pillow of poor patients, so that they could buy food. Pavlos Pieridis Picozis (1815–1865), studied at the University of Edinburgh and was the personal physician to the governor of Cyprus. Dr Antonios Tsepis (1868) was a Greek doctor who settled in Larnaca. He was in charge of the quarantine 1883–1905. Dr Thrasyvoulos Ropas (1870) was also a military doctor. He was a very good physician, but it was said that he was an eccentric and a humorist. He was announcing the deaths of his patients for his own advertisement. Frederic Charles Heidenstam (1876), who was a Swede, came to Cyprus and became chief medical officer in 1882. Neoclis Kyriazis (1877), was a municipal doctor and historian.

From the decade commencing in 1830 both Muslim and Christian citizens of Cyprus became increasingly aware of the need to control public health. An example is the fundraising in Larnaca in order to fund an institution to control disease outbreaks imported from shipping through the port. In 1835 the first Quarantine in Larnaca received bi-communal funding; however the Quarantine in Limassol did not open until 1845, and was a Christian-only initiative. Coincidental to the local efforts, the Ottoman Sultan ordered the establishment of port Quarantines throughout the Ottoman Empire.

Nonetheless, there was, to all intents and purposes, no functioning state medical system in Cyprus under Ottoman rule. There are reports of a Turkish military hospital near the Paphos gate in Nicosia; the only other hospital facility recorded in this period was the House of the Nuns in Larnaca. This was founded in 1844 and provided free healthcare until its closure in 1922 (Reference 21).

At the time, there were also plans to create the post of a municipal doctor. The major cities of Cyprus were full of prostitutes to cater for the needs of the newly arrived British soldiers. This led to an increase of sexually transmitted diseases. The municipalities used to keep a record and photographs of the prostitutes, asking them to have frequent medical examinations.

== British (1879-1960) ==
The first few decades of British coincided with an era of medical and scientific advances throughout the empire. Cyprus benefited both indirectly and directly: the new colonial outpost provided jobs for British doctors and nurses, but the British also encouraged indigenous Cypriots to pursue medical careers. Thus saying, during this period even Cypriot medical staff were trained off-island.

The first formal hospital was created in Larnaca in 1879 and the first doctor was Dr Heidenstam. His salary was £50 a year. In 1881 the hospital had 113 inpatients and 3485 outpatients. This was housed in some small buildings in the centre of the town and was locally called ‘ta spitouthkia tous arostous’ (the little houses of the sick).
