= Asclepiades of Tralles =

Ancient Greek bishop

Asclepiades (Ancient Greek: Ἀσκληπιάδης) was a bishop of Tralles who lived around 484 CE.

We have today a letter of his as well as ten anathematismi against Peter the Fuller, which were reprinted with a Latin translation in an edition of Philippe Labbe's.

In the 18th century, the classicist Johann Albert Fabricius described another letter of his as still extant in the "Vienna and Vatican libraries" in manuscript, though it is unclear where this is housed in modern times.

This Asclepiades is sometimes confused with, and must be distinguished from, an earlier Christian writer of the same name who is mentioned by the writer Lactantius.
