= Baia, Numidia =

Ancient city in the Roman Empire

Baia was an ancient city and bishopric in the Roman province of Africa Proconsulare. It is now a Roman Catholic titular see.

== History ==
Baia, identified with modern Henchir-Settara or Henchir-El-Hammam in present-day Algeria, was among the many towns in the Roman province of Numidia that were significant enough to become a suffragan diocese under papal authority.

Five of its Catholic bishops are historically recorded:

- Felix, who participated in a synod called by Bishop Gratus of Carthage in 349
- Beianus, who supported Maximianus of Carthage against the Donatist heresy in 394
- Valentinus, who attended the Council of Carthage in 411 as a Catholic bishop, convened by the (Western) Roman Emperor Honorius, and also his Donatist counterpart Quintasius, on the same heresy
- Valentinus, who participated as Primate of Numidia in the synod of Carthage in 419, addressing the issue of appeals to Rome
- Asclepius, an author writing against Arianism and Donatism in the mid-fifth century

== Titular see ==
The diocese was nominally restored in 1933 as the Latin Titular bishopric of Baia (Latin: Baianen(sis)).

It has had the following incumbents, all of whom held the Episcopal (lowest) rank:

- Miguel Alviter, Dominican Order (O.P.) (4 April 1502 – ?), served as Auxiliary Bishop of the Diocese of Plasencia (Spain) from 4 April 1502.
- Anthony Victor Hälg, Benedictine Order (O.S.B.) (born in Switzerland) (13 January 1949 – 29 November 1975), served first as Coadjutor Abbot of the Territorial Abbacy of Ndanda (Tanzania) from 13 January 1949 to 15 December 1949, then as Abbot Ordinary of Ndanda from 15 December 1949 until his retirement in 1972, after which he was emeritus.
- László Tóth (2 April 1976 – 6 July 1997) served as Auxiliary Bishop of the Diocese of Veszprém (Hungary) from 2 April 1976 to 5 June 1987 and was emeritus thereafter.
- Adriano Langa, Friars Minor (O.F.M.) (24 October 1997 – 1 April 2005) served as Auxiliary Bishop of the Archdiocese of Maputo (Mozambique) from 24 October 1997 to 1 April 2005, then as Coadjutor Bishop of the Diocese of Inhambane (Mozambique) from 1 April 2005 to 7 September 2006, succeeding as Bishop of Inhambane from 7 September 2006.
- Denis James Madden (10 May 2005 – present) served first as Auxiliary Bishop of the Archdiocese of Baltimore (Maryland, USA) from 10 May 2005 to 5 December 2016, and is currently emeritus.

== See also ==
- List of Catholic dioceses in Algeria

== Sources and external links ==
- GCatholic

Bibliography

- Pius Bonifacius Gams, Series episcoporum Ecclesiae Catholicae, Leipzig 1931, p. 464
- Stefano Antonio Morcelli, Africa christiana, Volume I, Brescia 1816, p. 94
- Auguste Audollent, lemma 'Baiensis' in Dictionnaire d'Histoire et de Géographie ecclésiastiques, vol. VI, 1932, coll. 240-241
- Joseph Mesnage, L'Afrique chrétienne, Paris 1912, p. 369
- Mansi, Sacrorum conciliorum nova et amplissima collectio, volumes III & IV, passim
- Bernelle, René (1892). "Ruines romaines d'Henchir-el-Hammam et mausolée de la famille Flavia". Revue africaine (in French). 207. Archived from the original on 2019-12-21.
- Laporte, Jean-Pierre (September 2006). "Henchir el-Hammam (antique Aquae Flavianae)". AOURAS (in French). 3.
