= Neoklis Kyriazis =

- Νεοκλής Κυριαζής
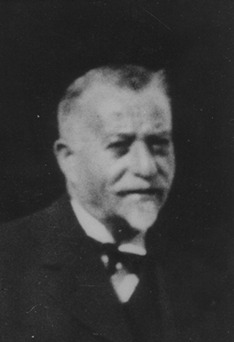
- Born: 1877; Nicosia, Ottoman Cyprus
- Died: 1956 (aged 78–79)
- Occupations: Doctor, Folklorist, Historian, Scholar, Writer
- Spouse: Maria Pieridi

Neoklis Kyriazis (Greek: Νεοκλής Κυριαζής; 1877 – August 1956) was a Cypriot medical doctor and historian known for his significant contributions to the history of Cyprus. He was a member of the National Council of Cyprus.

== Family ==
Neoklis Kyriazis was born in 1877 in Nicosia. His father was George Kyriazis, one of five Greek brothers from Thessaly, who founded the cigarette empire Kyriazi Freres. His mother was Zafiro Odyssea Chasapoglou great granddaughter of Tselepis Hadji-Petrakis Kytherios (1770–1830), one of the richest landowners in Cyprus. Neoklis' maternal grandmother, Maritsa Tano, was a descendant of the Tano family, belonging to the Italian nobility. He married Maria Pieridi (1871–1953), herself a descendant of another Italian nobility family (Cariddi).

== Historical work ==
Kyriazis was a member of the National Council of Cyprus. As a member of the St Lazarus Committee he founded the Museum of St Lazarus church in Larnaca. One of his greatest achievements was the salvage and subsequent publication of many historical details concerning Cyprus through the ages. He started publishing articles on this subject from 1909, and over a period of 47 years he published several books and over 370 articles and studies. He participated in the publication of the monumental 'Cyprus Chronicles' (Kypriaka Chronica) a scientific/historical magazine (1923–1937) consisting of 4200 pages. These Chronicles were under the auspices of a four-member committee (the Bishop of Kition Nikodemos Mylonas, prof. Ioannis Sykoutris, Loukis Z Pieridis, and Neoklis Kyriazis), and covered every aspect of the history of Cyprus from the ancient times through to the Turkish and subsequently British occupation. Kyriazis was the only, or nearly only, author of this periodical from 1929–1937.

== Medical doctor ==
He worked as medical doctor in Larnaca and wrote both scientific and popular papers on the Cypriot Medical History, a subject continued by his grandson Dr Marios Kyriazis. As a doctor he was credited with the founding of a quarantine facility to prevent the spread of communicable diseases from sailors visiting Larnaca. His medical library, instruments and other memorabilia are now exhibited at the Kyriazis Medical Museum in Larnaca.

== Books ==
- Popular Medicine (Dimodis Iatriki), 1926
- Historical Pages, 1929
- Bibliography of Cyprus (Kypriaki Bibliographia), 1935
- Cypriot Proverbs (Kypriakai Paroimiai), 1940
- Social Activities of Larnaca, 1947
- Historical News of the Holy Stavrovouni Monastery, 1948
- History of the Holy Kykkos Monastery, 1949
- Monasteries in Cyprus, 1950
- Names of the Holy Mother (Eponymiai tis Panagias), 1950
- The Villages of Cyprus, 1952
- History of Larnaca Municipality (published posthumously in 1995)

== Honours ==
The Bishop of Kition said: Kyriazis was a rare and constructive personality with live national consciousness and selfless love for this island. Larnaca Municipality honoured Kyriazis by naming a street after him. The Society of Cypriot Studies dedicated a commemorative plaque in the courtyard of St Lazarus church. This roughly translates as:

Of the same craft as Aesculapius - Neoklis Kyriazis - Humble pride of Larnaca - Lover of honourable letters - And sailor of the manuscripts - We salute you.

== See also ==
- Pavlos Xioutas
- Simos Menardos
