= Pierides Museum =

Museum in Larnaca, Cyprus

Coordinates: 34.9161°N 33.6363°E

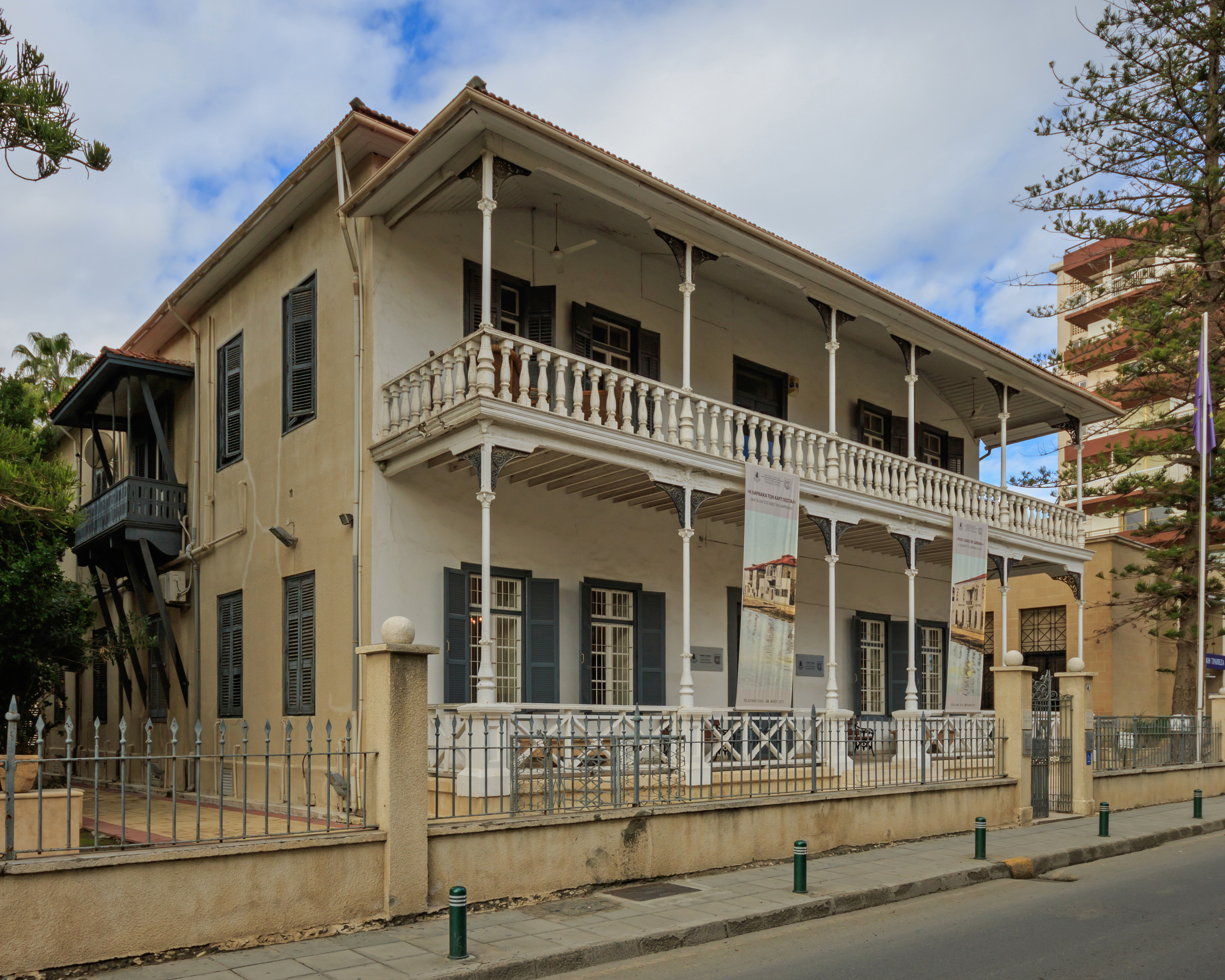
Pierides Museum

The Pierides Museum is a museum in Larnaca, Cyprus that was founded by the Pierides Foundation. It is the nation's oldest private museum.

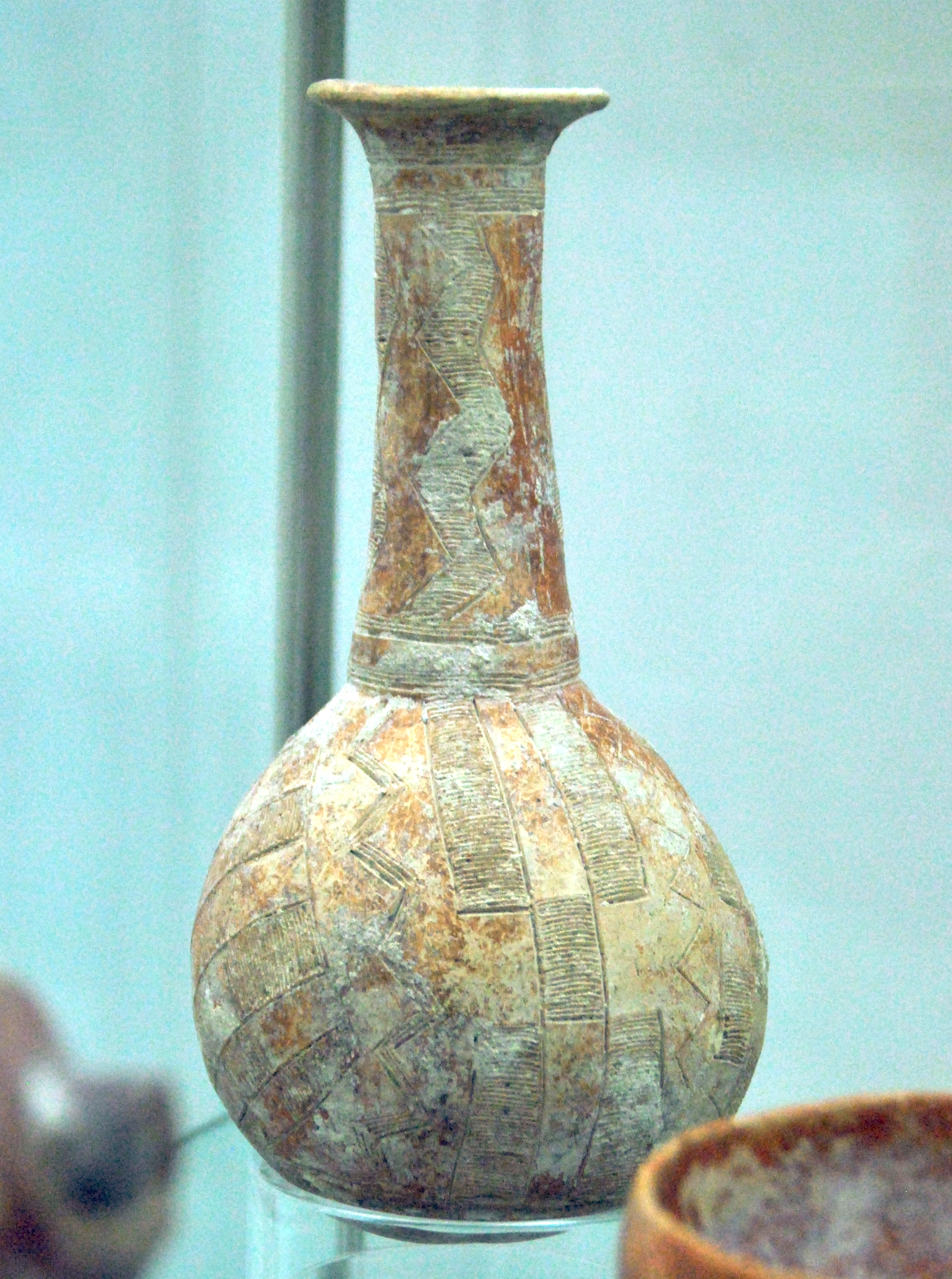
Cypriot Red Polished Ware II-III, 2200-1700 BC. Kiel, Germany

The placard on the museum building says (as of 2013) "Perides Museum - Bank of Cyprus Cultural Foundation". The collection was initiated by Demetrios Pierides, in the 19th century (1811 - 1895), with the aim of protecting and preserving Cyprus' antiquities and preventing the loss of the island's history.

The collections were built by five generations of the family. The archaeological collection is housed in the old residence of the Pierides family, a colonial style building, built in 1825. The exhibits beginning from the Neolithic times through the Bronze Age, Geometric, Archaic, Hellenistic, Roman and Byzantine - Medieval ages.

There is also a cartography collection of old maps and charts of Cyprus and the Eastern Mediterranean as well as a collection of Greek and Roman glassware.

Currently the museum is managed by Peter Ashdjian, an 8th generation Pierides.

== On display ==
The oldest objects on display are from 40th century BC.

Objects on display include Red Polished Ware from the early Bronze Age, Roman glassware and medieval ceramic dishes.

=== Halls ===
Hall 1: Prehistoric finds from approx. 7000 to 475 BC

Hall 2: Finds from Archaic to Roman times, approx. 750 BC to AD 395

Hall 3: Cartography from the Venetian period to the end of the British occupation, approx. 1489 to 1960 AD.

Hall 4: Hellenistic and Roman glass, approx. 325 BC to AD 395

Hall 5: Franconian ceramics, approx. 1191 to 1489 AD

== Larnaca Biennale ==
The Museum participates in the Larnaca Biennale, displaying contemporary art since 2018.

== See also ==
- Pieridis Museum
