= Chryspolitissa Orthodox Church =

Church in Lamaca, Cyprus

Also known as Panagia Chryssopolitissa and the Church of Virgin Mary of Chryssapolitissa,—the Chryspolitissa Orthodox Church is a church in Larnaca, Cyprus that was "built in the 18th century, most probably on the foundations of an earlier church".

It is located at the corner of Archiepiskopou Kyprianou Avenue and Panagias Chrysopolitissas.
